= Racism =

Race or ethnic-based discrimination

Racism is the belief that groups of humans possess different behavioral traits corresponding to inherited attributes and can be divided based on the superiority of one race or ethnicity over another. It may also mean prejudice, discrimination, or antagonism directed against other people because they are of a different ethnic background. Modern variants of racism are often based in social perceptions of biological differences between peoples. These views can take the form of social actions, practices or beliefs, or political systems in which different races are ranked as inherently superior or inferior to each other, based on presumed shared inheritable traits, abilities, or qualities. There have been attempts to legitimize racist beliefs through scientific means, such as scientific racism, which have been overwhelmingly shown to be unfounded. In terms of political systems (e.g. apartheid) that support the expression of prejudice or aversion in discriminatory practices or laws, racist ideology may include associated social aspects such as nativism, xenophobia, otherness, segregation, hierarchical ranking, and supremacism.

While the concepts of race and ethnicity are considered to be separate in contemporary social science, the two terms have a long history of equivalence in popular usage and older social science literature. "Ethnicity" is often used in a sense close to one traditionally attributed to "race", the division of human groups based on qualities assumed to be essential or innate to the group (e.g., shared ancestry or shared behavior). Racism and racial discrimination are often used to describe discrimination on an ethnic or cultural basis, independent of whether these differences are described as racial. According to the United Nations's Convention on the Elimination of All Forms of Racial Discrimination, there is no distinction between the discrimination resulting from either basis of race or ethnicity, but that the terms do have different meanings that may not always coincide. It further concludes that superiority based on racial differentiation is scientifically false, morally condemnable, socially unjust, and dangerous. The convention also declared that there is no justification for racial discrimination, anywhere, in theory or in practice.

Racism is frequently described as a relatively modern concept, evolving during the European age of imperialism, transformed by capitalism, and the Atlantic slave trade, of which it was a major driving force. It was also a major force behind racial segregation in the United States in the 19th and early 20th centuries, and of apartheid in South Africa; 19th and 20th-century racism in Western culture is particularly well documented and constitutes a reference point in studies and discourses about racism. Racism has played a role in genocides such as the Holocaust, the Armenian genocide, the Rwandan genocide, and the Genocide of Serbs in the Independent State of Croatia, as well as colonial projects including the European colonization of the Americas, Africa, Asia, and the population transfer in the Soviet Union including deportations of indigenous minorities. Indigenous peoples have been—and are—often subject to racist attitudes.

== Etymology, definition, and usage ==
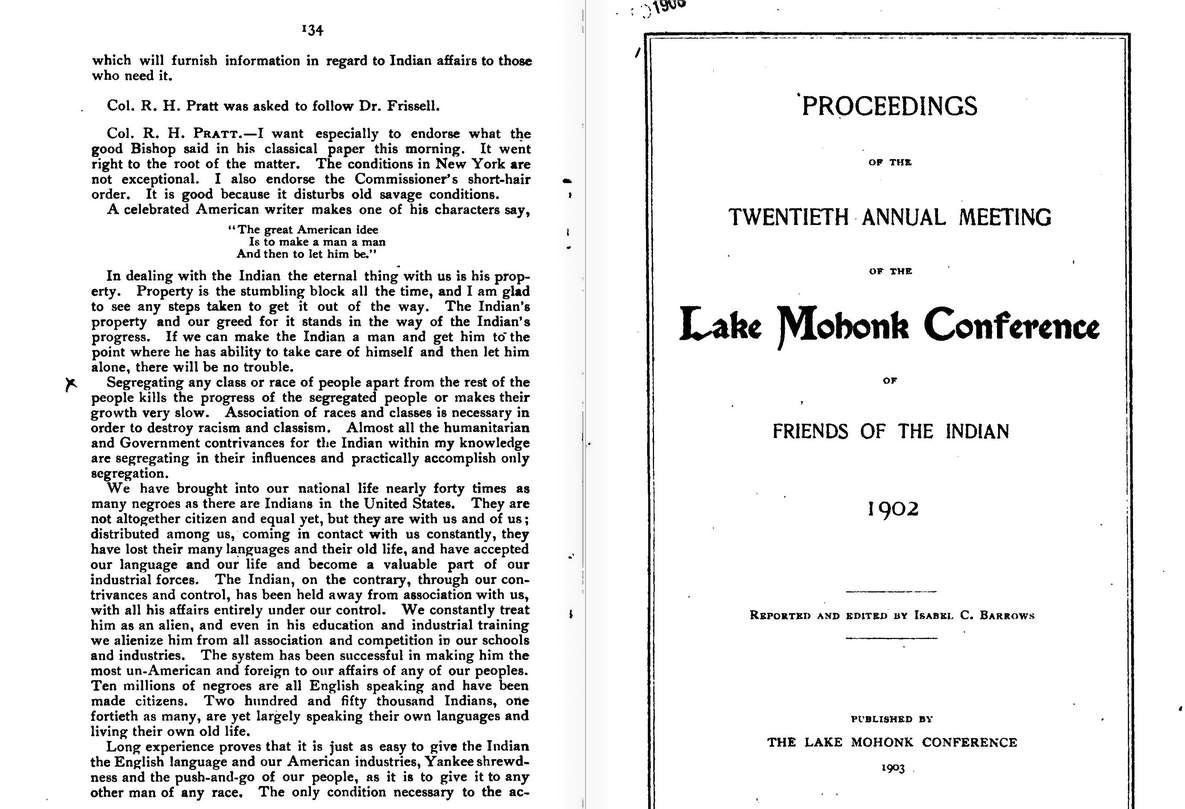
An early use of the word racism by Richard Henry Pratt in 1902: "Association of races and classes is necessary to destroy racism and classism."

In the 19th century, many scientists subscribed to the belief that the human population can be divided into races. The term racism is a noun describing the state of being racist, i.e., subscribing to the belief that the human population can or should be classified into races with differential abilities and dispositions, which in turn may motivate a political ideology in which rights and privileges are differentially distributed based on racial categories. The term "racist" may be an adjective or a noun, the latter describing a person who holds those beliefs. The origin of the root word "race" is not clear. Linguists generally agree that it came to the English language from Middle French, but there is no such agreement on how it generally came into Latin-based languages. A recent proposal is that it derives from the Arabic ra's, which means "head, beginning, origin" or the Hebrew rosh, which has a similar meaning. Early race theorists generally held the view that some races were inferior to others and they consequently believed that the differential treatment of races was fully justified. These early theories guided pseudo-scientific research assumptions; the collective endeavors to adequately define and form hypotheses about racial differences are generally termed scientific racism, though this term is a misnomer, due to the lack of any actual science backing the claims.

Most biologists, anthropologists, and sociologists reject a taxonomy of races in favor of more specific and/or empirically verifiable criteria, such as geography, ethnicity, or a history of endogamy. Human genome research indicates that race is not a meaningful genetic classification of humans.

An entry in the Oxford English Dictionary (2008) defines racialism as "[a]n earlier term than racism, but now largely superseded by it", and cites the term "racialism" in a 1902 quote by Richard Henry Pratt. The revised Oxford English Dictionary cites the shorter term "racism" in a quote from the year 1903. It was defined by the Oxford English Dictionary (2nd edition 1989) as "[t]he theory that distinctive human characteristics and abilities are determined by race"; the same dictionary termed racism a synonym of racialism: "belief in the superiority of a particular race". By the end of World War II, racism had acquired the same supremacist connotations formerly associated with racialism: racism by then implied racial discrimination, racial supremacism, and a harmful intent. The term "race hatred" had also been used by sociologist Frederick Hertz in the late 1920s.

As its history indicates, the popular use of the word racism is relatively recent. The word came into widespread usage in the Western world in the 1930s, when it was used to describe the social and political ideology of Nazism, which treated "race" as a naturally given political unit. It is commonly agreed that racism existed before the coinage of the word, but there is not a wide agreement on a single definition of what racism is and what it is not. Today, some scholars of racism prefer to use the concept in the plural racisms, in order to emphasize its many different forms that do not easily fall under a single definition. They also argue that different forms of racism have characterized different historical periods and geographical areas. Garner (2009: p. 11) summarizes different existing definitions of racism and identifies three common elements contained in those definitions of racism. First, a historical, hierarchical power relationship between groups; second, a set of ideas (an ideology) about racial differences; and, third, discriminatory actions (practices).

=== Legal ===
Though many countries around the globe have passed laws related to race and discrimination, the first significant international human rights instrument developed by the United Nations (UN) was the Universal Declaration of Human Rights (UDHR), which was adopted by the United Nations General Assembly in 1948. The UDHR recognizes that if people are to be treated with dignity, they require economic rights, social rights including education, and the rights to cultural and political participation and civil liberty. It further states that everyone is entitled to these rights "without distinction of any kind, such as race, colour, sex, language, religion, political or other opinion, national or social origin, property, birth or other status".

The UN does not define "racism"; however, it does define "racial discrimination". According to the 1965 UN International Convention on the Elimination of All Forms of Racial Discrimination,

The term "racial discrimination" shall mean any distinction, exclusion, restriction, or preference based on race, colour, descent, or national or ethnic origin that has the purpose or effect of nullifying or impairing the recognition, enjoyment or exercise, on an equal footing, of human rights and fundamental freedoms in the political, economic, social, cultural or any other field of public life.

In their 1978 United Nations Educational, Scientific, and Cultural Organization (UNESCO) Declaration on Race and Racial Prejudice (Article 1), the UN states, "All human beings belong to a single species and are descended from a common stock. They are born equal in dignity and rights and all form an integral part of humanity."

The UN definition of racial discrimination does not make any distinction between discrimination based on ethnicity and race, in part because the distinction between the two has been a matter of debate among academics, including anthropologists. Similarly, in British law, the phrase racial group means "any group of people who are defined by reference to their race, colour, nationality (including citizenship) or ethnic or national origin".

In Norway, the word "race" has been removed from national laws concerning discrimination because the use of the phrase is considered problematic and unethical. The Norwegian Anti-Discrimination Act bans discrimination based on ethnicity, national origin, descent, and skin color.

=== Social and behavioral sciences ===
Sociologists, in general, recognize "race" as a social construct. This means that, although the concepts of race and racism are based on observable biological characteristics, any conclusions drawn about race on the basis of those observations are heavily influenced by cultural ideologies. Racism, as an ideology, exists in a society at both the individual and institutional level.

While much of the research and work on racism during the last half-century or so has concentrated on "white racism" in the Western world, historical accounts of race-based social practices can be found across the globe. Thus, racism can be broadly defined to encompass individual and group prejudices and acts of discrimination that result in material and cultural advantages conferred on a majority or a dominant social group. So-called "white racism" focuses on societies in which white populations are the majority or the dominant social group. In studies of these majority white societies, the aggregate of material and cultural advantages is usually termed "white privilege".

Race and race relations are prominent areas of study in sociology and economics. Much of the sociological literature focuses on white racism. Some of the earliest sociological works on racism were written by sociologist W. E. B. Du Bois, the first African American to earn a doctoral degree from Harvard University. Du Bois wrote, "[t]he problem of the twentieth century is the problem of the color line." Wellman (1993) defines racism as "culturally sanctioned beliefs, which, regardless of intentions involved, defend the advantages whites have because of the subordinated position of racial minorities". In both sociology and economics, the outcomes of racist actions are often measured by the inequality in income, wealth, net worth, and access to other cultural resources (such as education), between racial groups.

In sociology and social psychology, racial identity and the acquisition of that identity, is often used as a variable in racism studies. Racial ideologies and racial identity affect individuals' perception of race and discrimination. Cazenave and Maddern (1999) define racism as "a highly organized system of 'race'-based group privilege that operates at every level of society and is held together by a sophisticated ideology of color/'race' supremacy. Racial centrality (the extent to which a culture recognizes individuals' racial identity) appears to affect the degree of discrimination African American young adults perceive whereas racial ideology may buffer the detrimental emotional effects of that discrimination." Sellers and Shelton (2003) found that a relationship between racial discrimination and emotional distress was moderated by racial ideology and social beliefs.

Some sociologists also argue that, particularly in the West, where racism is often negatively sanctioned in society, racism has changed from being a blatant to a more covert expression of racial prejudice. The "newer" (more hidden and less easily detectable) forms of racism—which can be considered embedded in social processes and structures—are more difficult to explore and challenge. It has been suggested that, while in many countries overt or explicit racism has become increasingly taboo, even among those who display egalitarian explicit attitudes, an implicit or aversive racism is still maintained subconsciously.

This process has been studied extensively in social psychology as implicit associations and implicit attitudes, a component of implicit cognition. Implicit attitudes are evaluations that occur without conscious awareness towards an attitude object or the self. These evaluations are generally either favorable or unfavorable. They come about from various influences in the individual experience. Implicit attitudes are not consciously identified (or they are inaccurately identified) traces of past experience that mediate favorable or unfavorable feelings, thoughts, or actions towards social objects. These feelings, thoughts, or actions have an influence on behavior of which the individual may not be aware.

Therefore, subconscious racism can influence our visual processing and how our minds work when we are subliminally exposed to faces of different colors. In thinking about crime, for example, social psychologist Jennifer L. Eberhardt (2004) of Stanford University holds that, "blackness is so associated with crime you're ready to pick out these crime objects." Such exposures influence our minds and they can cause subconscious racism in our behavior towards other people or even towards objects. Thus, racist thoughts and actions can arise from stereotypes and fears of which we are not aware. For example, scientists and activists have warned that the use of the stereotype "Nigerian Prince" for referring to advance-fee scammers is racist, i.e. "reducing Nigeria to a nation of scammers and fraudulent princes, as some people still do online, is a stereotype that needs to be called out".

=== Humanities ===
Language, linguistics, and discourse are active areas of study in the humanities, along with literature and the arts. Discourse analysis seeks to reveal the meaning of race and the actions of racists through careful study of the ways in which these factors of human society are described and discussed in various written and oral works. For example, Van Dijk (1992) examines the different ways in which descriptions of racism and racist actions are depicted by the perpetrators of such actions as well as by their victims. He notes that when descriptions of actions have negative implications for the majority, and especially for white elites, they are often seen as controversial and such controversial interpretations are typically marked with quotation marks or they are greeted with expressions of distance or doubt. The previously cited book, The Souls of Black Folk by W. E. B. Du Bois, represents early African American literature that describes the author's experiences with racism when he was traveling in the South as an African American.

Much American fictional literature has focused on issues of racism and the black "racial experience" in the US, including works written by whites, such as Uncle Tom's Cabin, To Kill a Mockingbird, and Imitation of Life, or even the non-fiction work Black Like Me. These books, and others like them, feed into what has been called the "white savior narrative in film", in which the heroes and heroines are white even though the story is about things that happen to black characters. Textual analysis of such writings can contrast sharply with black authors' descriptions of African Americans and their experiences in US society. African American writers have sometimes been portrayed in African American studies as retreating from racial issues when they write about "whiteness", while others identify this as an African American literary tradition called "the literature of white estrangement", part of a multi-pronged effort to challenge and dismantle white supremacy in the US.

=== Popular usage ===
According to dictionary definitions, racism is prejudice and discrimination based on race.

Racism can also be said to describe a condition in society in which a dominant racial group benefits from the oppression of others, whether that group wants such benefits or not. Foucauldian scholar Ladelle McWhorter, in her 2009 book, Racism and Sexual Oppression in Anglo-America: A Genealogy, posits modern racism similarly, focusing on the notion of a dominant group, usually whites, vying for racial purity and progress, rather than an overt or obvious ideology focused on the oppression of nonwhites.

In popular usage, as in some academic usage, little distinction is made between "racism" and "ethnocentrism". Often, the two are listed together as "racial and ethnic" in describing some action or outcome that is associated with prejudice within a majority or dominant group in society. Furthermore, the meaning of the term racism is often conflated with the terms prejudice, bigotry, and discrimination. Racism is a complex concept that can involve each of those; but it cannot be equated with, nor is it synonymous, with these other terms.

Some use the prejudice plus power approach to racism, seeing racism not in terms of individual discrimination, but in terms of power. This approach denies that minority groups are capable of racism, such as interminority racism.

== Aspects ==
The ideology underlying racism can manifest in many aspects of social life. Such aspects are described in this section, although the list is not exhaustive.

=== Aversive racism ===
Aversive racism is a form of implicit racism, in which a person's unconscious negative evaluations of racial or ethnic minorities are realized by a persistent avoidance of interaction with other racial and ethnic groups. As opposed to traditional, overt racism, which is characterized by overt hatred for and explicit discrimination against racial/ethnic minorities, aversive racism is characterized by more complex, ambivalent expressions and attitudes. Aversive racism is similar in implications to the concept of symbolic or modern racism (described below), which is also a form of implicit, unconscious, or covert attitude which results in unconscious forms of discrimination.

The term was coined by Joel Kovel to describe the subtle racial behaviors of any ethnic or racial group who rationalize their aversion to a particular group by appeal to rules or stereotypes. People who behave in an aversively racial way may profess egalitarian beliefs, and will often deny their racially motivated behavior; nevertheless they change their behavior when dealing with a member of another race or ethnic group than the one they belong to. The motivation for the change is thought to be implicit or subconscious. Experiments have provided empirical support for the existence of aversive racism. Aversive racism has been shown to have potentially serious implications for decision making in employment, in legal decisions and in helping behavior.

=== Color blindness ===
In relation to racism, color blindness is the disregard of racial characteristics in social interaction, for example in the rejection of affirmative action, as a way to address the results of past patterns of discrimination. Critics of this attitude argue that by refusing to attend to racial disparities, racial color blindness in fact unconsciously perpetuates the patterns that produce racial inequality.

Eduardo Bonilla-Silva argues that color blind racism arises from an "abstract liberalism, biologization of culture, naturalization of racial matters, and minimization of racism". Color blind practices are "subtle, institutional, and apparently nonracial" because race is explicitly ignored in decision-making. If race is disregarded in predominantly white populations, for example, whiteness becomes the normative standard, whereas people of color are othered, and the racism these individuals experience may be minimized or erased. At an individual level, people with "color blind prejudice" reject racist ideology, but also reject systemic policies intended to fix institutional racism.

=== Cultural ===
Cultural racism manifests as societal beliefs and customs that promote the assumption that the products of a given culture, including the language and traditions of that culture, are superior to those of other cultures. It shares a great deal with xenophobia, which is often characterized by fear of, or aggression toward, members of an outgroup by members of an ingroup. In that sense it is also similar to communalism as used in South Asia. Sociologist Ramón Grosfoguel argued that cultural racism had replaced biological racism in the United States during the civil rights movement of the 1960s. Cultural racism has been used to justify many things such as the Atlantic salve trade, apartheid, segregation, and health inequities.

Cultural racism exists when there is a widespread acceptance of stereotypes concerning diverse ethnic or population groups. Whereas racism can be characterised by the belief that one race is inherently superior to another, cultural racism can be characterized by the belief that one culture is inherently superior to another.

It is argued that cultural racism originates from Gomes Eanes de Zurara, who was a Portuguese chronicler during the European Age of Discovery for Prince Henry the Navigator. Zurara was hired to calm concerns surrounding slavery from the Catholic Church and other European states by justifying it through race. Historian Ibram X. Kendi's 2016 book, Stamped from the Beginning, argues that Zurara was the first cultural racist as Zurara was the first to create an extensive defense of the Atlantic slave trade through the concept of black inferiority. After the works of Zurara, White Europeans began to spend decades assigning and reassigning traits to each race to justify White supremacy.

=== Economic ===
Historical economic or social disparity is alleged to be a form of discrimination caused by past racism and historical reasons, affecting the present generation through deficits in the formal education and kinds of preparation in previous generations, and through primarily unconscious racist attitudes and actions on members of the general population. Some view that capitalism generally transformed racism depending on local circumstances, but racism is not necessary for capitalism. Economic discrimination may lead to choices that perpetuate racism. For example, color photographic film was tuned for white skin as are automatic soap dispensers and facial recognition systems.

=== Institutional ===
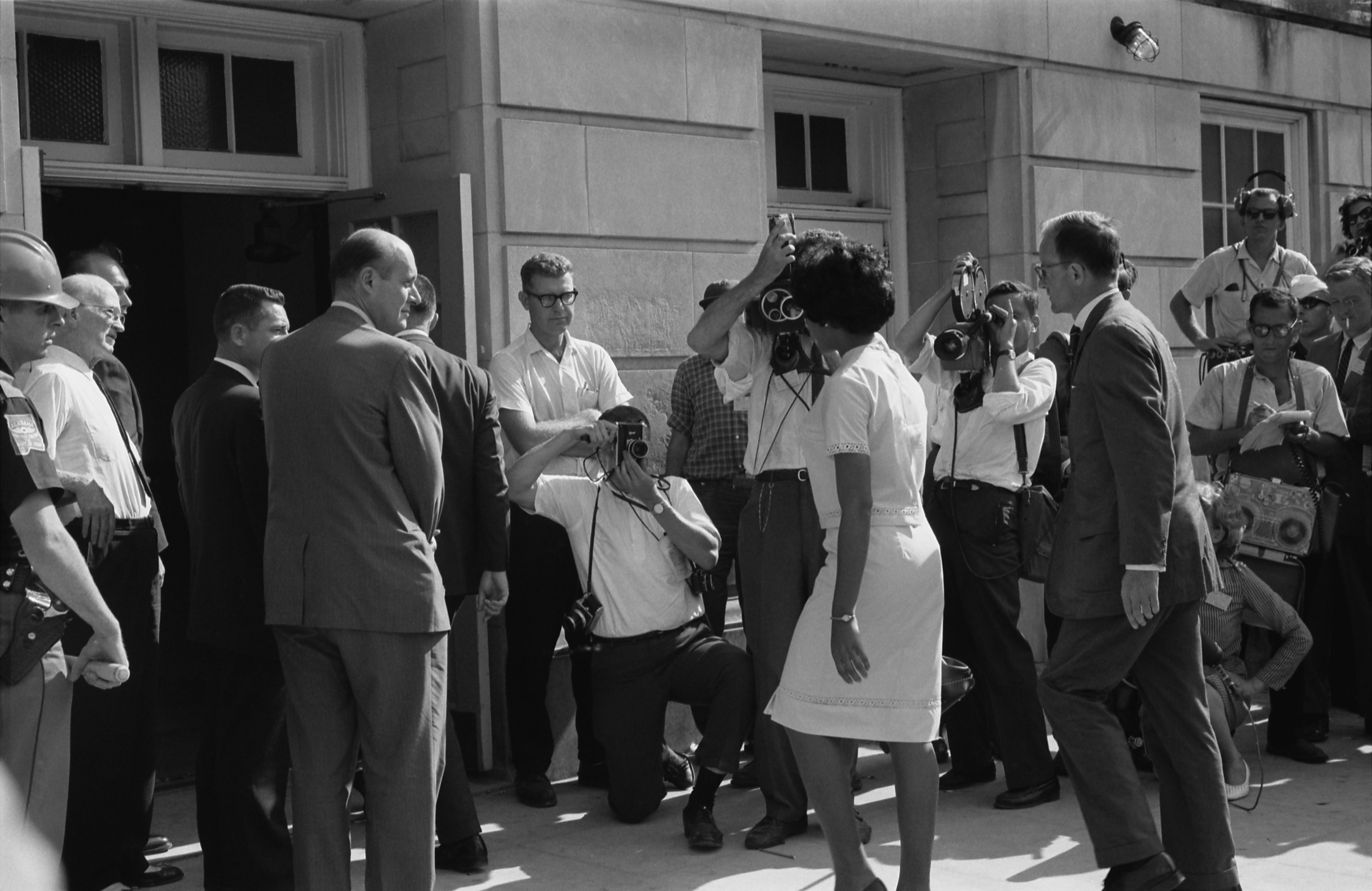
African-American university student Vivian Malone entering the University of Alabama in the US to register for classes as one of the first African-American students to attend the institution. Until 1963, the university was racially segregated and African-American students were not allowed to attend.

Institutional racism (also known as structural racism, state racism, or systemic racism) is racial discrimination by governments, corporations, religions, or educational institutions or other large organizations with the power to influence the lives of many individuals. Stokely Carmichael is credited for coining the phrase institutional racism in the late 1960s. He defined the term as "the collective failure of an organization to provide an appropriate and professional service to people because of their colour, culture or ethnic origin".

Maulana Karenga argued that racism constituted the destruction of culture, language, religion, and human possibility and that the effects of racism were "the morally monstrous destruction of human possibility involved redefining African humanity to the world, poisoning past, present and future relations with others who only know us through this stereotyping and thus damaging the truly human relations among peoples".

Institutional racism refers to racism in terms of a power structure that protects the interests of the dominant culture and actively discriminates against ethnic minorities, not only in terms of individual prejudice or formal discrimination.

=== Othering ===
Othering is the term used by some to describe a system of discrimination whereby the characteristics of a group are used to distinguish them as separate from the norm.

Othering plays a fundamental role in the history and continuation of racism. To objectify a culture as something different, exotic or underdeveloped is to generalize that it is not like 'normal' society. Europe's colonial attitude towards the Orientals exemplifies this as it was thought that the East was the opposite of the West; feminine where the West was masculine, weak where the West was strong and traditional where the West was progressive. By making these generalizations and othering the East, Europe was simultaneously defining herself as the norm, further entrenching the gap.

Much of the process of othering relies on imagined difference, or the expectation of difference. Spatial difference can be enough to conclude that "we" are "here" and the "others" are over "there". Imagined differences serve to categorize people into groups and assign them characteristics that suit the imaginer's expectations.

=== Racial discrimination ===
Racial discrimination refers to discrimination against someone on the basis of their race.

=== Racial segregation ===
External videos
- James A. White Sr.: The little problem I had renting a house, TED Talks, 14:20, 20 February 2015

Racial segregation is the separation of humans into socially-constructed racial groups in daily life. It may apply to activities such as eating in a restaurant, drinking from a water fountain, using a bathroom, attending school, going to the movies, or in the rental or purchase of a home. Segregation is generally outlawed, but may exist through social norms, even when there is no strong individual preference for it, as suggested by Thomas Schelling's models of segregation and subsequent work.

=== Reverse racism ===
Reverse racism is a concept often used to describe acts of discrimination or hostility against members of a dominant racial or ethnic group or favoring members of minority groups. This concept has been used especially in debates over color-conscious policies (such as affirmative action) intended to remedy racial inequalities. However, many deny the existence of reverse racism. According to the substantive equality approach, while minority groups may discriminate against members of the dominant group, they lack the social power to actively oppress them, and they are therefore incapable of the prejudice plus power form of racism. Martha Minow refers to the differences between formal equality of opportunity and substantive equality as the Dilemma of difference. According to Richard Arneson affirmative action violates formal equality of opportunity.

=== Supremacism ===
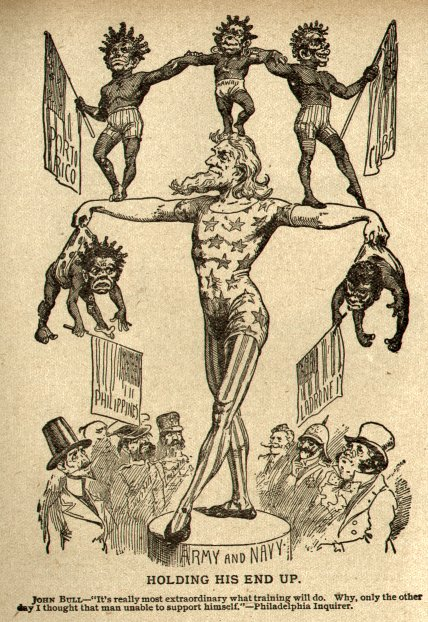
In 1899 Uncle Sam (a personification of the United States) balances his new possessions which are depicted as savage children. The figures are Puerto Rico, Hawaii, Cuba, Philippines and "Ladrones" (the Mariana Islands).

Centuries of European colonialism in the Americas, Africa and Asia were often justified by white supremacist attitudes. During the early 20th century, the phrase "The White Man's Burden" was widely used to justify an imperialist policy as a noble enterprise. A justification for the policy of conquest and subjugation of Native Americans emanated from the stereotyped perceptions of the indigenous people as "merciless Indian savages", as they are described in the United States Declaration of Independence. Sam Wolfson of The Guardian writes that "the declaration's passage has often been cited as an encapsulation of the dehumanizing attitude toward indigenous Americans that the US was founded on." In an 1890 article about colonial expansion onto Native American land, author L. Frank Baum wrote: "The Whites, by law of conquest, by justice of civilization, are masters of the American continent, and the best safety of the frontier settlements will be secured by the total annihilation of the few remaining Indians." In his Notes on the State of Virginia, published in 1785, Thomas Jefferson wrote: "blacks, whether originally a distinct race, or made distinct by time or circumstances, are inferior to the whites in the endowments of both body and mind." Attitudes of black supremacy, Arab supremacy, and East Asian supremacy also exist.

=== Symbolic/modern ===
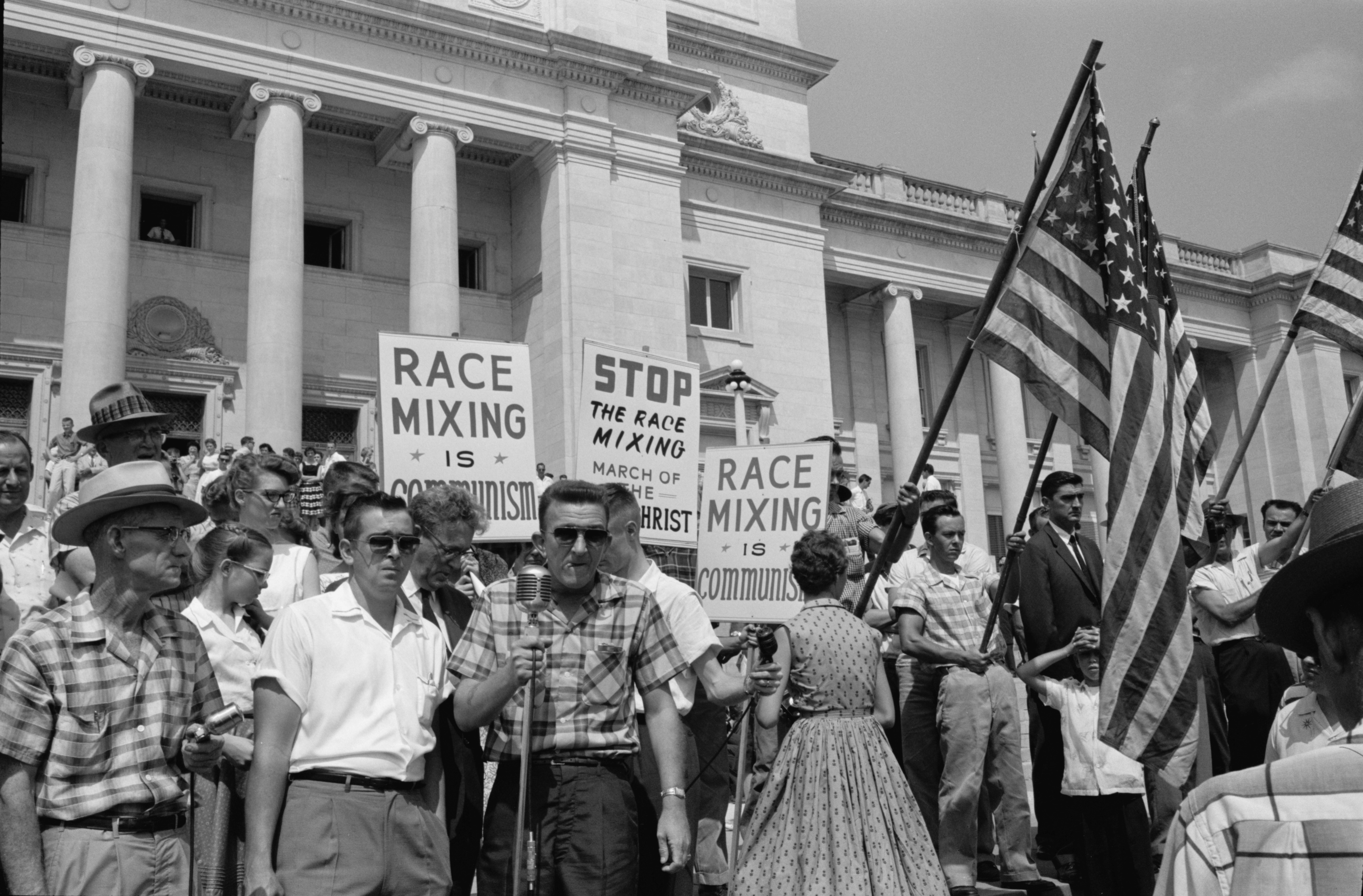
A rally against school integration in Little Rock, Arkansas, 1959

Some scholars argue that in the US, earlier violent and aggressive forms of racism have evolved into a more subtle form of prejudice in the late 20th century. This new form of racism is sometimes referred to as "modern racism" and it is characterized by outwardly acting unprejudiced while inwardly maintaining prejudiced attitudes, displaying subtle prejudiced behaviors such as actions informed by attributing qualities to others based on racial stereotypes, and evaluating the same behavior differently based on the race of the person being evaluated. This view is based on studies of prejudice and discriminatory behavior, where some people will act ambivalently towards black people, with positive reactions in certain, more public contexts, but more negative views and expressions in more private contexts. This ambivalence may also be visible for example in hiring decisions where job candidates that are otherwise positively evaluated may be unconsciously disfavored by employers in the final decision because of their race. Some scholars consider modern racism to be characterized by an explicit rejection of stereotypes, combined with resistance to changing structures of discrimination for reasons that are ostensibly non-racial, an ideology that considers opportunity at a purely individual basis denying the relevance of race in determining individual opportunities and the exhibition of indirect forms of micro-aggression toward and/or avoidance of people of other races.

=== Subconscious biases ===
Recent research has shown that individuals who consciously claim to reject racism may still exhibit race-based subconscious biases in their decision-making processes. While such "subconscious racial biases" do not fully fit the definition of racism, their impact can be similar, though typically less pronounced, not being explicit, conscious or deliberate.

== International law and racial discrimination ==
In 1919, a proposal to include a racial equality provision in the Covenant of the League of Nations was supported by a majority, but not adopted in the Paris Peace Conference in 1919. In 1943, Japan and its allies declared work for the abolition of racial discrimination to be their aim at the Greater East Asia Conference. Article 1 of the 1945 UN Charter includes "promoting and encouraging respect for human rights and for fundamental freedoms for all without distinction as to race" as UN purpose.

In 1950, UNESCO suggested in The Race Question—a statement signed by 21 scholars such as Ashley Montagu, Claude Lévi-Strauss, Gunnar Myrdal, Julian Huxley, etc.—to "drop the term race altogether and instead speak of ethnic groups". The statement condemned scientific racism theories that had played a role in the Holocaust. It aimed both at debunking scientific racist theories, by popularizing modern knowledge concerning "the race question", and morally condemned racism as contrary to the philosophy of the Enlightenment and its assumption of equal rights for all. Along with Myrdal's An American Dilemma: The Negro Problem and Modern Democracy (1944), The Race Question influenced the 1954 U.S. Supreme Court desegregation decision in Brown v. Board of Education. Also, in 1950, the European Convention on Human Rights was adopted, which was widely used on racial discrimination issues.

The United Nations use the definition of racial discrimination laid out in the International Convention on the Elimination of All Forms of Racial Discrimination, adopted in 1966:

... any distinction, exclusion, restriction or preference based on race, color, descent, or national or ethnic origin that has the purpose or effect of nullifying or impairing the recognition, enjoyment or exercise, on an equal footing, of human rights and fundamental freedoms in the political, economic, social, cultural or any other field of public life. (Part 1 of Article 1 of the U.N. International Convention on the Elimination of All Forms of Racial Discrimination)

In 2001, the European Union explicitly banned racism, along with many other forms of social discrimination, in the Charter of Fundamental Rights of the European Union, the legal effect of which, if any, would necessarily be limited to Institutions of the European Union: "Article 21 of the charter prohibits discrimination on any ground such as race, color, ethnic or social origin, genetic features, language, religion or belief, political or any other opinion, membership of a national minority, property, disability, age or sexual orientation and also discrimination on the grounds of nationality."

== Ideology ==
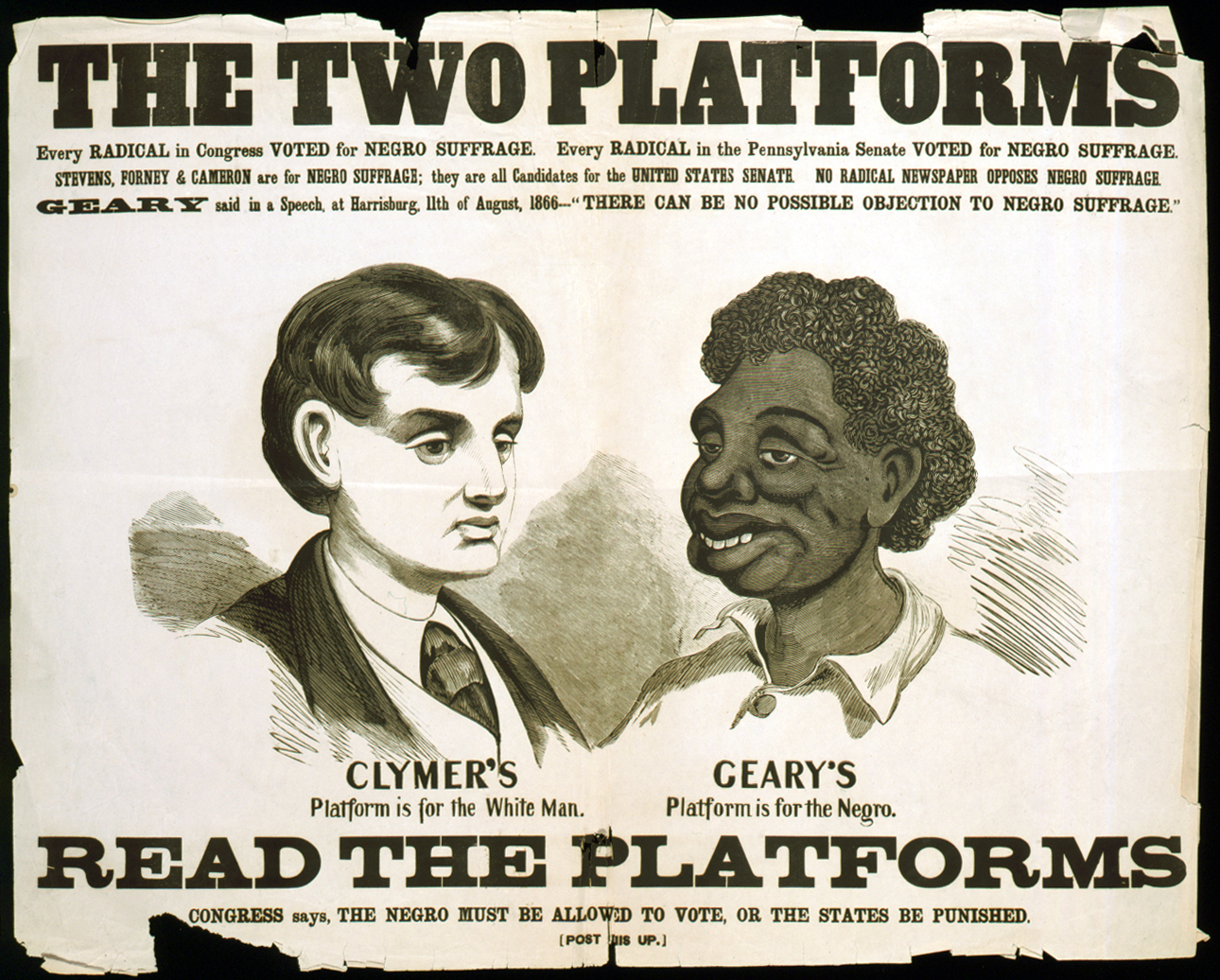
A pro–Hiester Clymer racist political campaign poster from the 1866 Pennsylvania gubernatorial election

Racism existed during the 19th century as scientific racism, which attempted to provide a racial classification of humanity. In 1775 Johann Blumenbach divided the world's population into five groups according to skin color (Caucasians, Mongols, etc.), positing the view that the non-Caucasians had arisen through a process of degeneration. Another early view in scientific racism was the polygenist view, which held that the different races had been separately created. Polygenist Christoph Meiners (1747 – May 1810) for example, split mankind into two divisions which he labeled the "beautiful White race" and the "ugly Black race". In Meiners' book, The Outline of History of Mankind, he claimed that a main characteristic of race is either beauty or ugliness. He viewed only the white race as beautiful. He considered ugly races to be inferior, immoral and animal-like.

Anders Retzius (1796–1860) demonstrated that neither Europeans nor others are one "pure race", but of mixed origins. While discredited, derivations of Blumenbach's taxonomy are still widely used for the classification of the population in the United States. Hans Peder Steensby, while strongly emphasizing that all humans today are of mixed origins, in 1907 claimed that the origins of human differences must be traced extraordinarily far back in time, and conjectured that the "purest race" today would be the Australian Aboriginals.

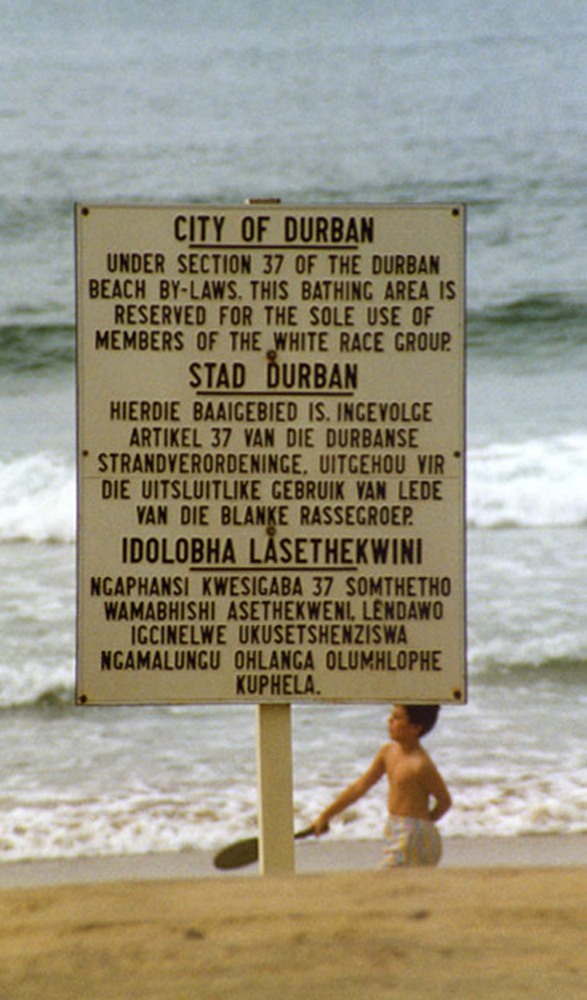
A sign on a racially segregated beach during Apartheid in South Africa, stating that the area is for the "sole use of members of the white race group"

Scientific racism fell strongly out of favor in the early 20th century, but the origins of fundamental human and societal differences are still researched within academia, in fields such as human genetics including paleogenetics, social anthropology, comparative politics, history of religions, history of ideas, prehistory, history, ethics, and psychiatry. There is widespread rejection of any methodology based on anything similar to Blumenbach's races. It is more unclear to which extent and when ethnic and national stereotypes are accepted.

Although after World War II and the Holocaust, racist ideologies were discredited on ethical, political and scientific grounds, racism and racial discrimination have remained widespread around the world.

Du Bois observed that it is not so much "race" that we think about, but culture: "... a common history, common laws and religion, similar habits of thought and a conscious striving together for certain ideals of life". Late 19th century nationalists were the first to embrace contemporary discourses on "race", ethnicity, and "survival of the fittest" to shape new nationalist doctrines. Ultimately, race came to represent not only the most important traits of the human body, but was also regarded as decisively shaping the character and personality of the nation. According to this view, culture is the physical manifestation created by ethnic groupings, as such fully determined by racial characteristics. Culture and race became considered intertwined and dependent upon each other, sometimes even to the extent of including nationality or language to the set of definition. Pureness of race tended to be related to rather superficial characteristics that were easily addressed and advertised, such as blondness. Racial qualities tended to be related to nationality and language rather than the actual geographic distribution of racial characteristics. In the case of Nordicism, the denomination "Germanic" was equivalent to superiority of race.

Bolstered by some nationalist and ethnocentric values and achievements of choice, this concept of racial superiority evolved to distinguish from other cultures that were considered inferior or impure. This emphasis on culture corresponds to the modern mainstream definition of racism: "[r]acism does not originate from the existence of 'races'. It creates them through a process of social division into categories: anybody can be racialised, independently of their somatic, cultural, religious differences."

This definition explicitly ignores the biological concept of race, which is still subject to scientific debate. In the words of David C. Rowe, "[a] racial concept, although sometimes in the guise of another name, will remain in use in biology and in other fields because scientists, as well as lay persons, are fascinated by human diversity, some of which is captured by race."

Racial prejudice became subject to international legislation. For instance, the Declaration on the Elimination of All Forms of Racial Discrimination, adopted by the United Nations General Assembly on 20 November 1963, addresses racial prejudice explicitly next to discrimination for reasons of race, colour or ethnic origin (Article I).

== Ethnicity and ethnic conflicts ==
A mass grave being dug for frozen bodies from the 1890 Wounded Knee Massacre, in which the U.S. Army killed 150 Lakota people, marking the end of the American Indian Wars

Debates over the origins of racism often suffer from a lack of clarity over the term. Many use the term "racism" to refer to more general phenomena, such as xenophobia and ethnocentrism, although scholars attempt to clearly distinguish those phenomena from racism as an ideology or from scientific racism, which has little to do with ordinary xenophobia. Others conflate recent forms of racism with earlier forms of ethnic and national conflict. In most cases, ethno-national conflict seems to owe itself to conflict over land and strategic resources. In some cases, ethnicity and nationalism were harnessed in order to rally combatants in wars between great religious empires (for example, the Muslim Turks and the Catholic Austro-Hungarians).

Notions of race and racism have often played central roles in ethnic conflicts. Throughout history, when an adversary is identified as "other" based on notions of race or ethnicity (in particular when "other" is interpreted to mean "inferior"), the means employed by the self-presumed "superior" party to appropriate territory, human chattel, or material wealth often have been more ruthless, more brutal, and less constrained by moral or ethical considerations. According to historian Daniel Richter, Pontiac's Rebellion saw the emergence on both sides of the conflict of "the novel idea that all Native people were 'Indians,' that all Euro-Americans were 'Whites,' and that all on one side must unite to destroy the other". Basil Davidson states in his documentary, Africa: Different but Equal, that racism, in fact, only just recently surfaced as late as the 19th century, due to the need for a justification for slavery in the Americas.

Historically, racism was a major driving force behind the transatlantic slave trade. It was also a major force behind racial segregation, especially in the United States in the nineteenth and early twentieth centuries, and South Africa under apartheid; 19th and 20th century racism in the Western world is particularly well documented and constitutes a reference point in studies and discourses about racism. Racism has played a role in genocides such as the Armenian genocide, and the Holocaust, and colonial projects like the European colonization of the Americas, Africa, and Asia. Indigenous peoples have been—and are—often subject to racist attitudes. Practices and ideologies of racism are condemned by the United Nations in the Declaration of Human Rights.

=== Ethnic and racial nationalism ===
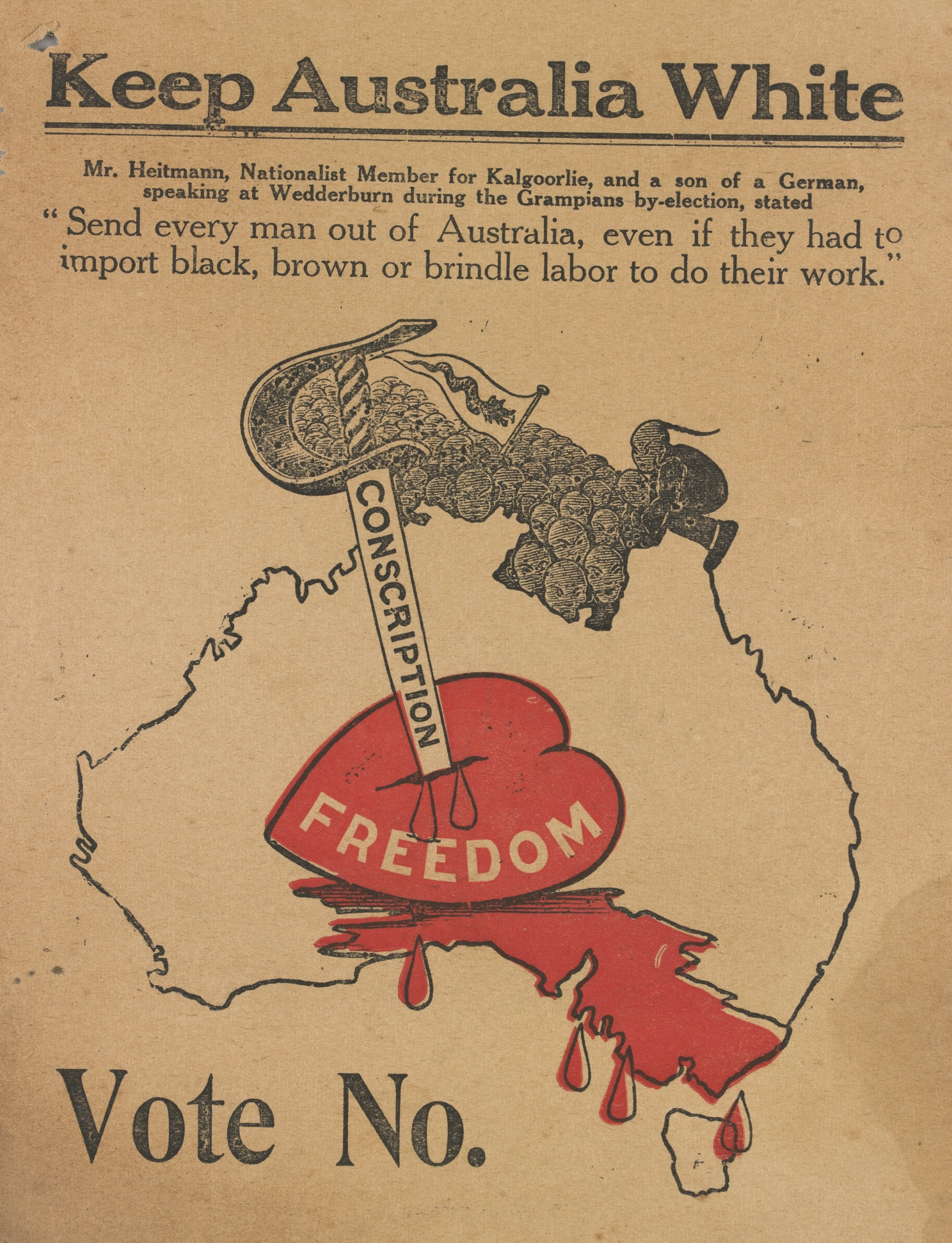
A 1917 anti-conscription propaganda leaflet imploring voters to "keep Australia white". A horde of Asians bearing a dragon flag is shown to the north.

After the Napoleonic Wars, Europe was confronted with the new "nationalities question", leading to reconfigurations of the European map, on which the frontiers between the states had been delineated during the 1648 Peace of Westphalia. Nationalism had made its first appearance with the invention of the levée en masse by the French Revolutionaries, thus inventing mass conscription in order to be able to defend the newly founded Republic against the Ancien Régime order represented by the European monarchies. This led to the French Revolutionary Wars (1792–1802) and then to the conquests of Napoleon, and to the subsequent European-wide debates on the concepts and realities of nations, and in particular of nation-states. The Westphalia Treaty had divided Europe into various empires and kingdoms (such as the Ottoman Empire, the Holy Roman Empire, the Swedish Empire, the Kingdom of France, etc.), and for centuries wars were waged between princes (Kabinettskriege in German).

Modern nation-states appeared in the wake of the French Revolution, with the formation of patriotic sentiments for the first time in Spain during the Peninsula War (1808–1813, known in Spain as the Independence War). Despite the restoration of the previous order with the 1815 Congress of Vienna, the "nationalities question" became the main problem of Europe during the Industrial Era, leading in particular to the 1848 Revolutions, the Italian unification completed during the 1871 Franco-Prussian War, which itself culminated in the proclamation of the German Empire in the Hall of Mirrors in the Palace of Versailles, thus achieving the German unification.

Meanwhile, the Ottoman Empire, the "sick man of Europe", was confronted with endless nationalist movements, which, along with the dissolving of the Austrian-Hungarian Empire, would lead to the creation, after World War I, of the various nation-states of the Balkans, with "national minorities" in their borders.

Ethnic nationalism, which advocated the belief in a hereditary membership of the nation, made its appearance in the historical context surrounding the creation of the modern nation-states.

One of its main influences was the Romantic nationalist movement at the turn of the 19th century, represented by figures such as Johann Herder (1744–1803), Johan Fichte (1762–1814) in the Addresses to the German Nation (1808), Friedrich Hegel (1770–1831), or also, in France, Jules Michelet (1798–1874). It was opposed to liberal nationalism, represented by authors such as Ernest Renan (1823–1892), who conceived of the nation as a community, which, instead of being based on the Volk ethnic group and on a specific, common language, was founded on the subjective will to live together ("the nation is a daily plebiscite", 1882) or also John Stuart Mill (1806–1873). Ethnic nationalism blended with scientific racist discourses, as well as with "continental imperialist" (Hannah Arendt, 1951) discourses, for example in the pan-Germanism discourses, which postulated the racial superiority of the German Volk (people/folk). The Pan-German League (Alldeutscher Verband), created in 1891, promoted German imperialism and "racial hygiene", and was opposed to intermarriage with Jews. Another popular current, the Völkisch movement, was also an important proponent of the German ethnic nationalist discourse, and it combined Pan-Germanism with modern racial antisemitism. Members of the Völkisch movement, in particular the Thule Society, would participate in the founding of the German Workers' Party (DAP) in Munich in 1918, the predecessor of the Nazi Party. Pan-Germanism played a decisive role in the interwar period of the 1920s–1930s.

These currents began to associate the idea of the nation with the biological concept of a "master race" (often the "Aryan race" or the "Nordic race") issued from the scientific racist discourse. They conflated nationalities with ethnic groups, called "races", in a radical distinction from previous racial discourses that posited the existence of a "race struggle" inside the nation and the state itself. Furthermore, they believed that political boundaries should mirror these alleged racial and ethnic groups, thus justifying ethnic cleansing, in order to achieve "racial purity" and also to achieve ethnic homogeneity in the nation-state.

Such racist discourses, combined with nationalism, were not, however, limited to pan-Germanism. In France, the transition from Republican liberal nationalism, to ethnic nationalism, which made nationalism a characteristic of far-right movements in France, took place during the Dreyfus Affair at the end of the 19th century. During several years, a nationwide crisis affected French society, concerning the alleged treason of Alfred Dreyfus, a French Jewish military officer. The country polarized itself into two opposite camps, one represented by Émile Zola, who wrote J'Accuse…! in defense of Alfred Dreyfus, and the other represented by the nationalist poet, Maurice Barrès (1862–1923), one of the founders of the ethnic nationalist discourse in France. At the same time, Charles Maurras (1868–1952), founder of the monarchist Action française movement, theorized the "anti-France", composed of the "four confederate states of Protestants, Jews, Freemasons and foreigners" (his actual word for the latter being the pejorative métèques). Indeed, to him the first three were all "internal foreigners", who threatened the ethnic unity of the French people.

== History ==
=== Ethnocentrism and proto-racism ===
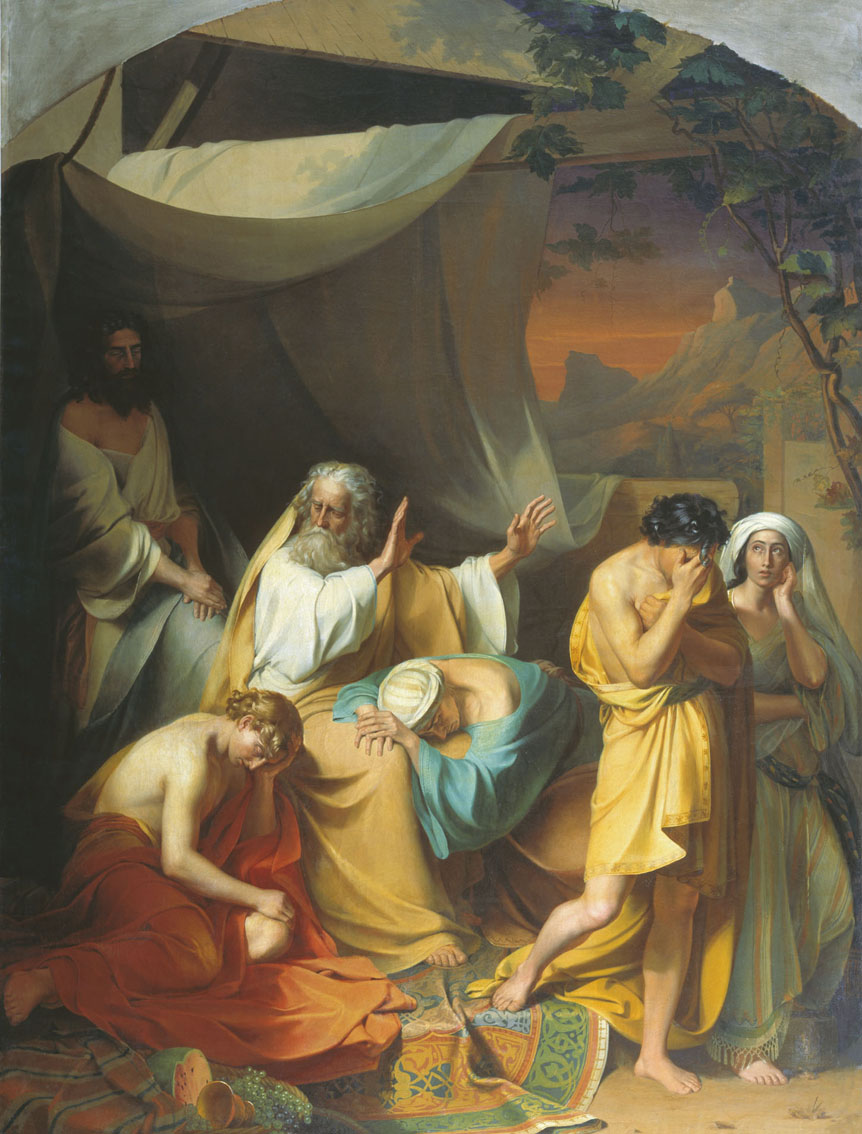
The Book of Genesis's biblical curse on Canaan, which was often misinterpreted as a curse on his father Ham, was used to justify slavery in 19th century America.

==== Aristotle ====
Bernard Lewis has cited the Greek philosopher Aristotle who, in his discussion of slavery, stated that while Greeks are free by nature, "barbarians" (non-Greeks) are slaves by nature, in that it is in their nature to be more willing to submit to a despotic government. Though Aristotle does not specify any particular races, he argues that people from nations outside Greece are more prone to the burden of slavery than those from Greece. While Aristotle makes remarks about the most natural slaves being those with strong bodies and slave souls (unfit for rule, unintelligent) which would seem to imply a physical basis for discrimination, he also explicitly states that the right kind of souls and bodies do not always go together, implying that the greatest determinate for inferiority and natural slaves versus natural masters is the soul, not the body. The modern version of racism based on the idea of hereditary inferiority had not yet been developed, and Aristotle never explicitly stated whether he believed the supposed natural inferiority of Barbarians was caused by environment and climate (like many of his contemporaries) or by birth.

Historian Dante A. Puzzo, in his discussion of Aristotle, racism, and the ancient world writes that:

Racism rests on two basic assumptions: that a correlation exists between physical characteristics and moral qualities; that mankind is divisible into superior and inferior stocks. Racism, thus defined, is a modern conception, for prior to the XVIth century there was virtually nothing in the life and thought of the West that can be described as racist. To prevent misunderstanding a clear distinction must be made between racism and ethnocentrism ... The Ancient Hebrews, in referring to all who were not Hebrews as Gentiles, were indulging in ethnocentrism, not in racism. ... So it was with the Hellenes who denominated all non-Hellenes—whether the wild Scythians or the Egyptians whom they acknowledged as their mentors in the arts of civilization—Barbarians, the term denoting that which was strange or foreign.

==== Early antisemitism ====
Some scholars suggest that anti-Jewish policies under the Hellenistic empires and the Roman Empire constitute examples of ancient racism. Other scholars have criticized this view as based on an ahistorical conception of race, and argued that such policies were aimed at repressing a religious group resistant to imperialism and conformity rather than a racialized entity.

==== Medieval Arab writers ====
Bernard Lewis has also cited historians and geographers of the Middle East and North Africa region, including Al-Muqaddasi, Al-Jahiz, Al-Masudi, Abu Rayhan Biruni, Nasir al-Din al-Tusi, and Ibn Qutaybah. Though the Qur'an expresses no racial prejudice, Lewis argues that ethnocentric prejudice later developed among Arabs, for a variety of reasons: their extensive conquests and slave trade; the influence of Aristotelian ideas regarding slavery, which some Muslim philosophers directed towards Zanj (Bantu) and Turkic peoples; and the influence of Judeo-Christian ideas regarding divisions among humankind. By the eighth century, anti-black prejudice among Arabs resulted in discrimination. A number of medieval Arabic authors argued against this prejudice, urging respect for all black people and especially Ethiopians. Notable Islamic caliphs with Sub-Saharan ancestry include Abu al-Misk Kafur Al-Mustansir Billah, Yaqub al-Mansur, Abu al-Hasan Ali ibn Othman, Sultan of the Marinid dynasty and Moulay Ismail Ibn Sharif.

By the 14th century, a significant number of slaves came from sub-Saharan Africa; Lewis argues that this led to the likes of Egyptian historian Al-Abshibi (1388–1446) writing that "[i]t is said that when the [black] slave is sated, he fornicates, when he is hungry, he steals." According to Lewis, the 14th-century Tunisian scholar Ibn Khaldun also wrote:

...beyond [known peoples of black West Africa] to the south there is no civilization in the proper sense. There are only humans who are closer to dumb animals than to rational beings. They live in thickets and caves, and eat herbs and unprepared grain. They frequently eat each other. They cannot be considered human beings. Therefore, the Negro nations are, as a rule, submissive to slavery, because (Negroes) have little that is (essentially) human and possess attributes that are quite similar to those of dumb animals, as we have stated.

According to Wesleyan University professor Abdelmajid Hannoum, French Orientalists projected racist and colonialist views of the 19th century into their translations of medieval Arabic writings, including those of Ibn Khaldun. This resulted in the translated texts racializing Arabs and Berber people, when no such distinction was made in the originals. James E. Lindsay argues that the concept of an Arab identity itself did not exist until modern times, though others like Robert Hoyland have argued that a common sense of Arab identity already existed by the 9th century.

=== Limpieza de sangre ===
With the Umayyad Caliphate's conquest of Hispania, Muslim Arabs and Berbers overthrew the previous Visigothic rulers and created Al-Andalus, which contributed to the Golden age of Jewish culture, and lasted for six centuries. It was followed by the centuries-long Reconquista, during which Christian Iberian kingdoms contested Al-Andalus and progressively conquered the divided Muslim kingdoms, culminating in the fall of the Nasrid kingdom of Granada in 1492 and the rise of Ferdinand V and Isabella I as Catholic monarchs of Spain. The legacy Catholic Spaniards then formulated the limpieza de sangre ("cleanliness of blood") doctrine. It was during this time in history that the Western concept of aristocratic "blue blood" emerged in a racialized, religious and feudal context, so as to stem the upward social mobility of the converted New Christians. Robert Lacey explains:

It was the Spaniards who gave the world the notion that an aristocrat's blood is not red but blue. The Spanish nobility started taking shape around the ninth century in classic military fashion, occupying land as warriors on horseback. They were to continue the process for more than five hundred years, clawing back sections of the peninsula from its Moorish occupiers, and a nobleman demonstrated his pedigree by holding up his sword arm to display the filigree of blue-blooded veins beneath his pale skin—proof that his birth had not been contaminated by the dark-skinned enemy. Sangre azul, blue blood, was thus a euphemism for being a white man—Spain's own particular reminder that the refined footsteps of the aristocracy through history carry the rather less refined spoor of racism.

Following the expulsion of the Arabic Moors and most of the Sephardic Jews from the Iberian peninsula, the remaining Jews and Muslims were forced to convert to Roman Catholicism, becoming "New Christians", who were sometimes discriminated against by the "Old Christians" in some cities (including Toledo), despite condemnations by the Church and the State, which both welcomed the new flock. The Inquisition was carried out by members of the Dominican Order in order to weed out the converts who still practiced Judaism and Islam in secret. The system and ideology of the limpieza de sangre ostracized false Christian converts from society in order to protect it against treason. The remnants of such legislation persevered into the 19th century in military contexts.

In Portugal, the legal distinction between New and Old Christian was only ended through a legal decree issued by the Marquis of Pombal in 1772, almost three centuries after the implementation of the racist discrimination. The limpieza de sangre legislation was common also during the colonization of the Americas, where it led to the racial and feudal separation of peoples and social strata in the colonies. It was however often ignored in practice, as the new colonies needed skilled people.

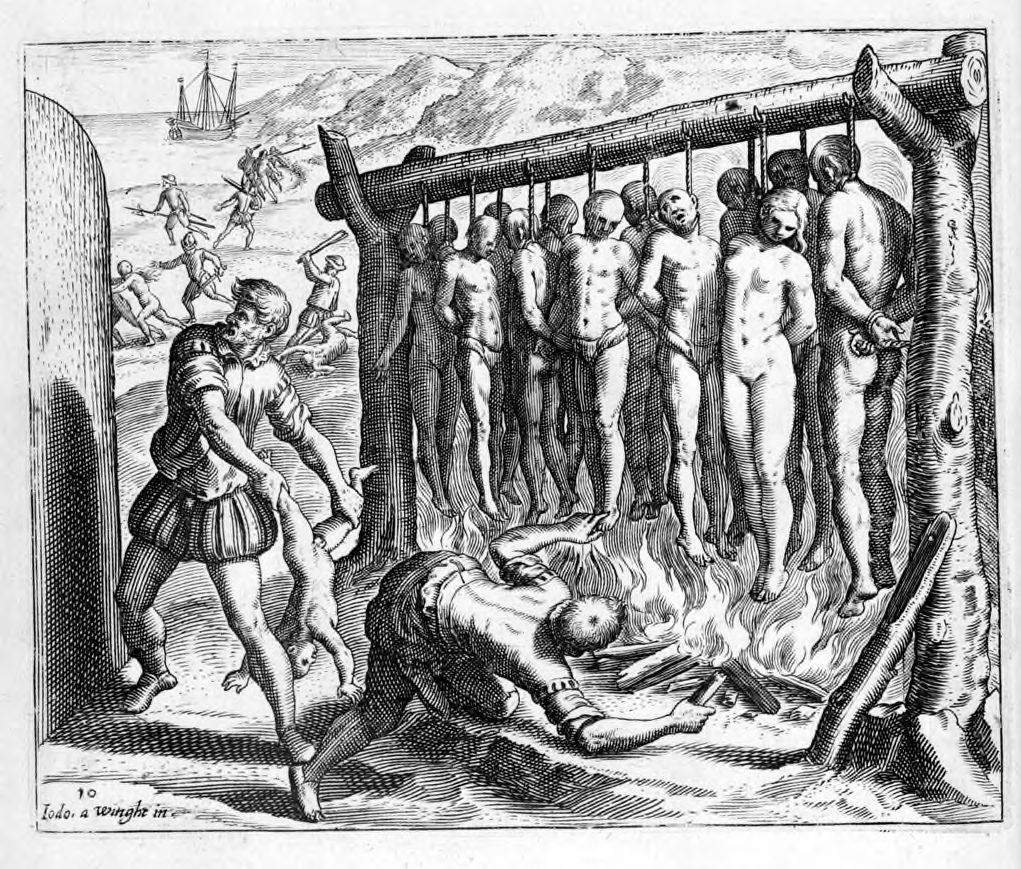
A 16th-century illustration by Flemish Protestant Theodor de Bry for Las Casas's Brevisima relación de la destrucción de las Indias, depicting Spanish atrocities during the conquest of Cuba

At the end of the Renaissance, the Valladolid debate (1550–1551), concerning the treatment of the natives of the "New World" pitted the Dominican friar and Bishop of Chiapas, Bartolomé de Las Casas, to another Dominican and Humanist philosopher, Juan Ginés de Sepúlveda. The latter argued that the Indians practiced human sacrifice of innocents, cannibalism, and other such "crimes against nature"; they were unacceptable and should be suppressed by any means possible including war, thus reducing them to slavery or serfdom was in accordance with Catholic theology and natural law. To the contrary, Bartolomé de Las Casas argued that the Amerindians were free men in the natural order and deserved the same treatment as others, according to Catholic theology. It was one of the many controversies concerning racism, slavery, religion, and European morality that would arise in the following centuries and which resulted in the legislation protecting the natives. The marriage between Luisa de Abrego, a free black domestic servant from Seville and Miguel Rodríguez, a white segovian conquistador in 1565 in St. Augustine (Spanish Florida), is the first known and recorded Christian marriage anywhere in the continental United States.

In the Spanish colonies, Spaniards developed a complex caste system based on race, which was used for social control, and which also determined a person's importance in society. While many Latin American countries have long since rendered the system officially illegal through legislation, usually at the time of their independence, prejudice based on degrees of perceived racial distance from European ancestry combined with one's socioeconomic status remain, an echo of the colonial caste system.

=== Racism as a modern phenomenon ===
Racism is frequently described as a modern phenomenon. In the view of the French philosopher and historian Michel Foucault, the first formulation of racism emerged in the early modern period as the "discourse of race struggle", and a historical and political discourse, which Foucault opposed to the philosophical and juridical discourse of sovereignty.

This European discourse, which first appeared in Great Britain, was then carried on in France by such people as Boulainvilliers (1658–1722), Nicolas Fréret (1688–1749), and then, during the 1789 French Revolution, Sieyès, and afterwards, Augustin Thierry and Cournot. Boulainvilliers, who created the matrix of such racist discourse in France, conceived of the "race" as being something closer to the sense of a "nation", that is, in his time, the "race" meant the "people".

He conceived of France as being divided between various nations—the unified nation-state is an anachronism here—which themselves formed different "races". Boulainvilliers opposed the absolute monarchy, which tried to bypass the aristocracy by establishing a direct relationship to the Third Estate. Thus, he developed the theory that the French aristocrats were the descendants of foreign invaders, whom he called the "Franks", while according to him, the Third Estate constituted the autochthonous, vanquished Gallo-Romans, who were dominated by the Frankish aristocracy as a consequence of the right of conquest. Early modern racism was opposed to nationalism and the nation-state: the Comte de Montlosier, in exile during the French Revolution, who borrowed Boulainvilliers' discourse on the "Nordic race" as being the French aristocracy that invaded the plebeian "Gauls", thus showed his contempt for the Third Estate, calling it "this new people born of slaves ... mixture of all races and of all times".

=== 19th century ===
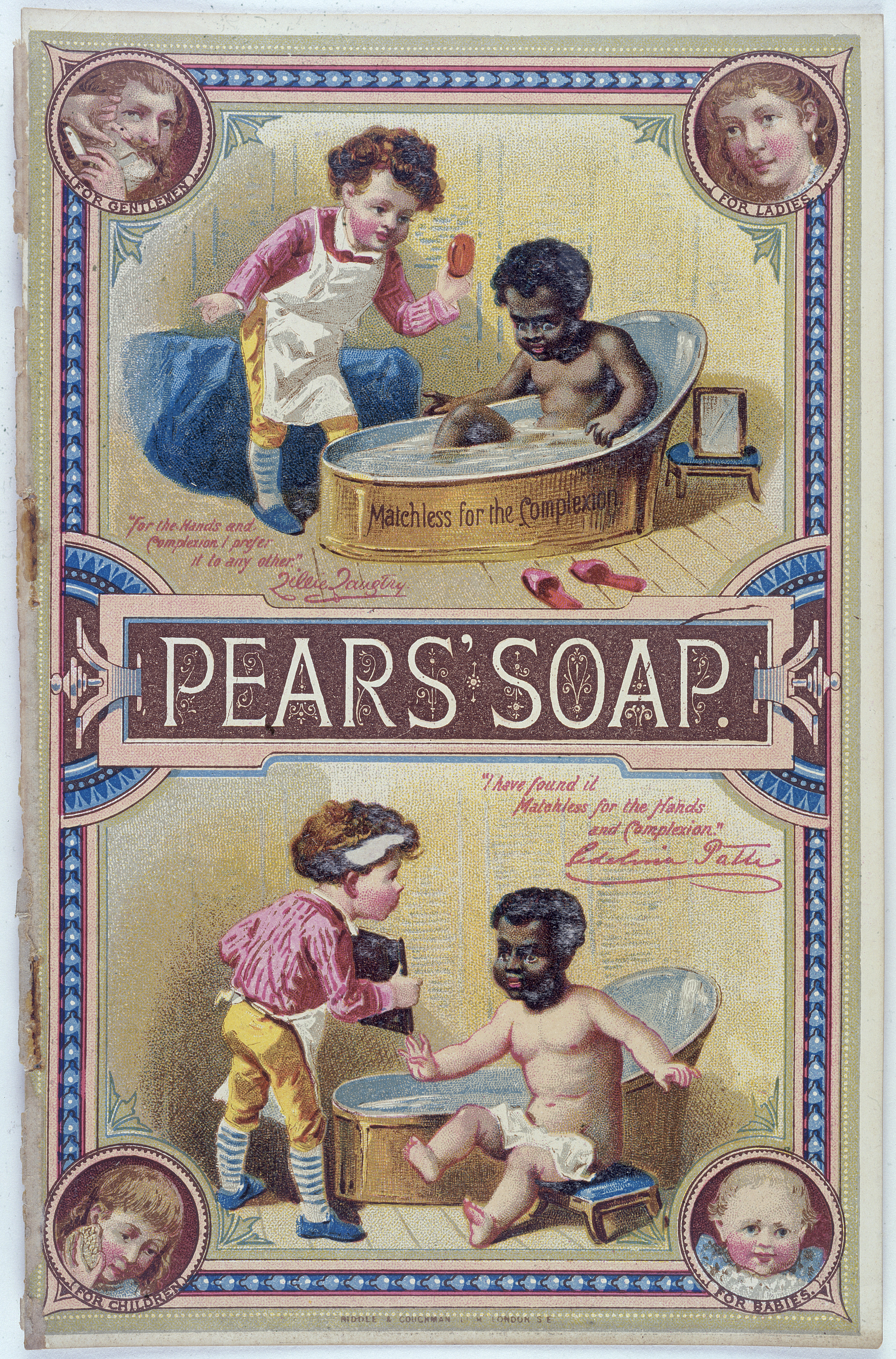
Advertisement for Pears' Soap Caption reads, "Matchless for the complexion..." Illustration of 'before and after' use of soap by black child in the bath; soap washes off his dark complexion.

While 19th-century racism became closely intertwined with nationalism, leading to the ethnic nationalist discourse that identified the "race" with the "folk", leading to such movements as pan-Germanism, pan-Turkism, pan-Arabism, and pan-Slavism, medieval racism precisely divided the nation into various non-biological "races", which were thought to be the consequence of historical conquests and social conflicts. Michel Foucault traced the genealogy of modern racism to this medieval "historical and political discourse of race struggle". According to him, it divided itself in the 19th century according to two rival lines: on one hand, it was incorporated by racists, biologists and eugenicists, who gave it the modern sense of "race", and they also transformed this popular discourse into a "state racism" (e.g., Nazism). On the other hand, Marxism also seized this discourse founded on the assumption of a political struggle that provided the real engine of history and continued to act underneath the apparent peace. Thus, Marxists transformed the essentialist notion of "race" into the historical notion of "class struggle", defined by socially structured positions: capitalist or proletarian. In The Will to Knowledge (1976), Foucault analyzed another opponent of the "race struggle" discourse: Sigmund Freud's psychoanalysis, which opposed the concept of "blood heredity", prevalent in the 19th century racist discourse.

Authors such as Hannah Arendt, in her 1951 book The Origins of Totalitarianism, have said that the racist ideology (popular racism) which developed at the end of the 19th century helped legitimize the imperialist conquests of foreign territories and the atrocities that sometimes accompanied them (such as the Herero and Nama genocide of 1904–1908 or the Armenian genocide of 1915–1917). Rudyard Kipling's poem, The White Man's Burden (1899), is one of the more famous illustrations of the belief in the inherent superiority of the European culture over the rest of the world, though it is also thought to be a satirical appraisal of such imperialism. Racist ideology thus helped legitimize the conquest and incorporation of foreign territories into an empire, which were regarded as a humanitarian obligation partially as a result of these racist beliefs.

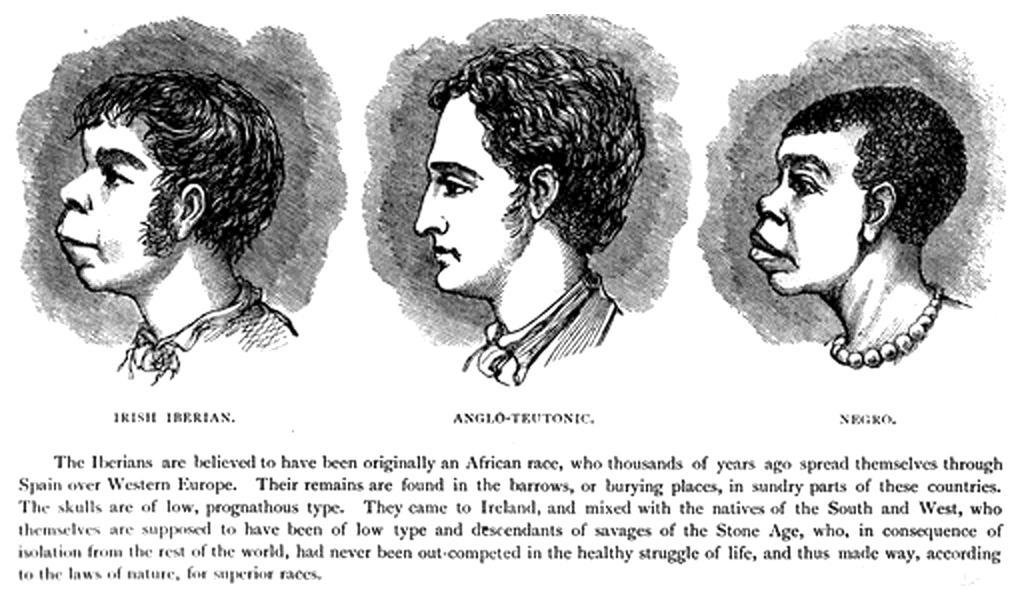
A late-19th-century illustration from Ireland from One or Two Neglected Points of View by H. Strickland Constable shows an alleged similarity between "Irish Iberian" and "Negro" features in contrast to the "higher" "Anglo-Teutonic".

However, during the 19th century, Western European colonial powers were involved in the suppression of the Arab slave trade in Africa, as well as in the suppression of the slave trade in West Africa. Some Europeans during the time period objected to injustices that occurred in some colonies and lobbied on behalf of aboriginal peoples. Thus, when the Hottentot Venus was displayed in England in the beginning of the 19th century, the African Association publicly opposed itself to the exhibition. The same year that Kipling published his poem, Joseph Conrad published Heart of Darkness (1899), a clear criticism of the Congo Free State, which was owned by Leopold II of Belgium.

Examples of racial theories used include the creation of the Hamitic theory during the European exploration of Africa. The term Hamite was applied to different populations within North Africa, mainly comprising Ethiopians, Eritreans, Somalis, Berbers, and the ancient Egyptians. Hamites were regarded as Caucasoid peoples who probably originated in either Arabia or Asia on the basis of their cultural, physical and linguistic similarities with the peoples of those areas. Europeans considered Hamites to be more civilized than Sub-Saharan Africans, and more akin to themselves and Semitic peoples. In the first two-thirds of the 20th century, the Hamitic race was, in fact, considered one of the branches of the Caucasian race, along with the Indo-Europeans, Semites, and the Mediterraneans.

However, the Hamitic peoples themselves were often deemed to have failed as rulers, which was usually ascribed to interbreeding with Negroes. In the mid-20th century, the German scholar Carl Meinhof (1857–1944) claimed that the Bantu race was formed by a merger of Hamitic and Negro races. The Hottentots (Nama or Khoi) were formed by the merger of Hamitic and Bushmen (San) races—both being termed nowadays as Khoisan peoples.

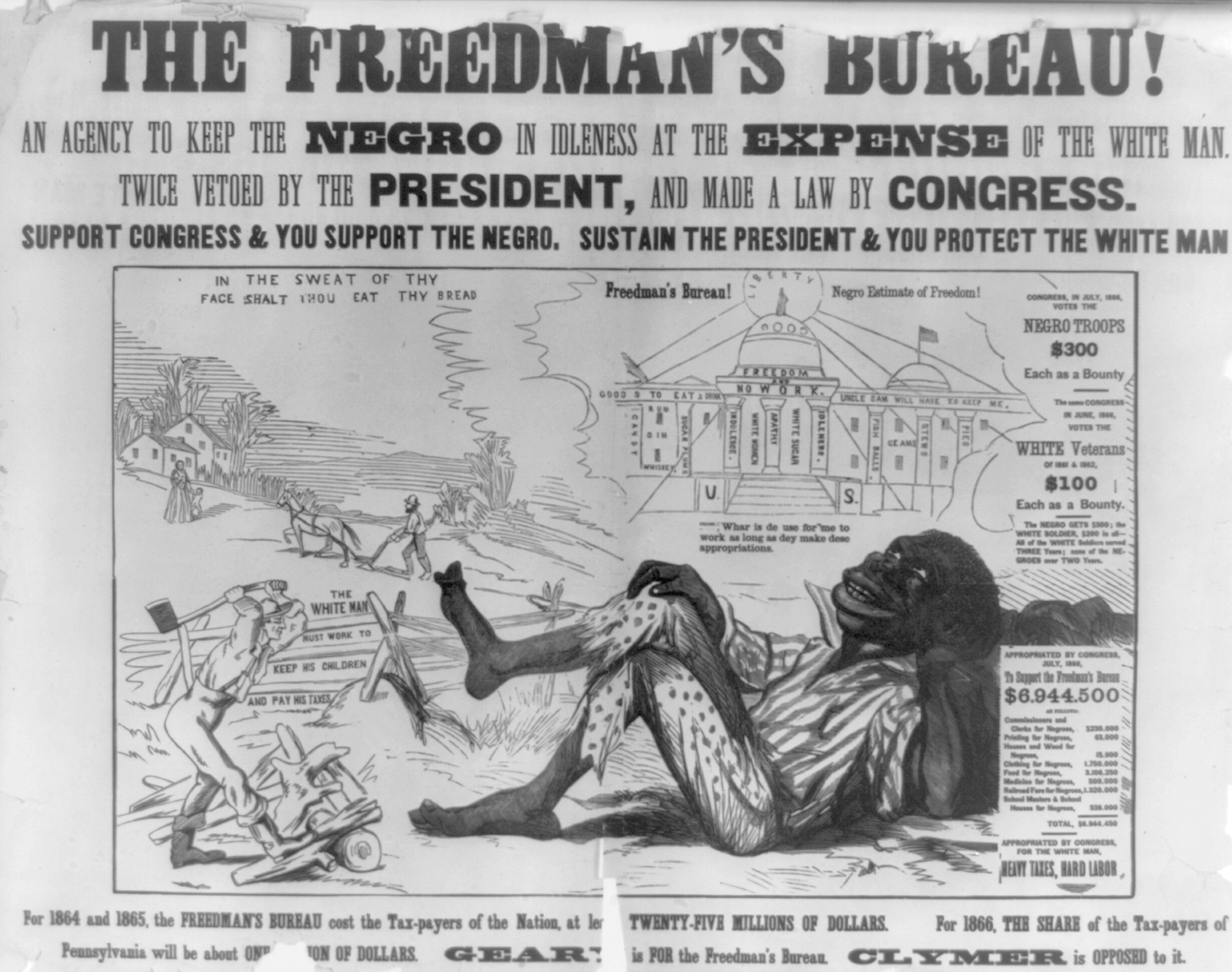
One in a series of posters attacking Radical Republicans on the issue of black suffrage, issued during the Pennsylvania gubernatorial election of 1866

In the United States in the early 19th century, the American Colonization Society was established as the primary vehicle for proposals to return black Americans to greater freedom and equality in Africa. The colonization effort resulted from a mixture of motives with its founder Henry Clay stating that "unconquerable prejudice resulting from their color, they never could amalgamate with the free whites of this country. It was desirable, therefore, as it respected them, and the residue of the population of the country, to drain them off". Racism spread throughout the New World in the late 19th century and early 20th century. Whitecapping, which started in Indiana in the late 19th century, soon spread throughout all of North America, causing many African laborers to flee from the land they worked on. In the US, during the 1860s, racist posters were used during election campaigns. In one of these racist posters (see above), a black man is depicted lounging idly in the foreground as one white man ploughs his field and another chops wood. Accompanying labels are: "In the sweat of thy face shalt thou eat thy bread", and "The white man must work to keep his children and pay his taxes." The black man wonders, "Whar is de use for me to work as long as dey make dese appropriations." Above in a cloud is an image of the "Freedman's Bureau! Negro Estimate of Freedom!" The bureau is pictured as a large domed building resembling the U.S. Capitol and is inscribed "Freedom and No Work". Its columns and walls are labeled, "Candy", "Rum, Gin, Whiskey", "Sugar Plums", "Indolence", "White Women", "Apathy", "White Sugar", "Idleness", and so on.

On 5 June 1873, Sir Francis Galton, distinguished English explorer and cousin of Charles Darwin, wrote in a letter to The Times:

My proposal is to make the encouragement of Chinese settlements of Africa a part of our national policy, in the belief that the Chinese immigrants would not only maintain their position, but that they would multiply and their descendants supplant the inferior Negro race ... I should expect that the African seaboard, now sparsely occupied by lazy, palavering savages, might in a few years be tenanted by industrious, order-loving Chinese, living either as a semidetached dependency of China, or else in perfect freedom under their own law.

=== 20th century ===
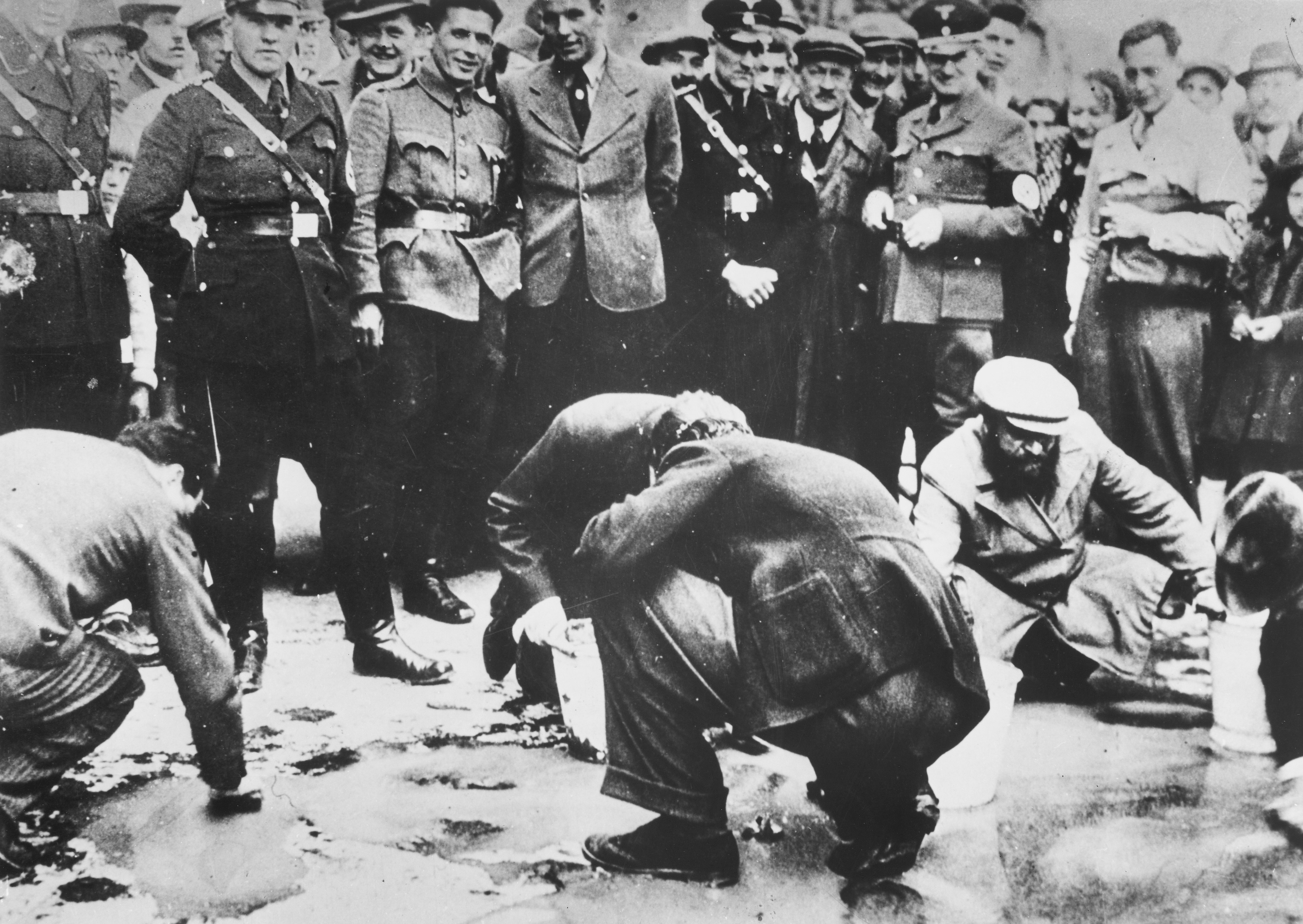
Austrian Nazis and local residents watch as Jews are forced to scrub the pavement, Vienna, March 1938

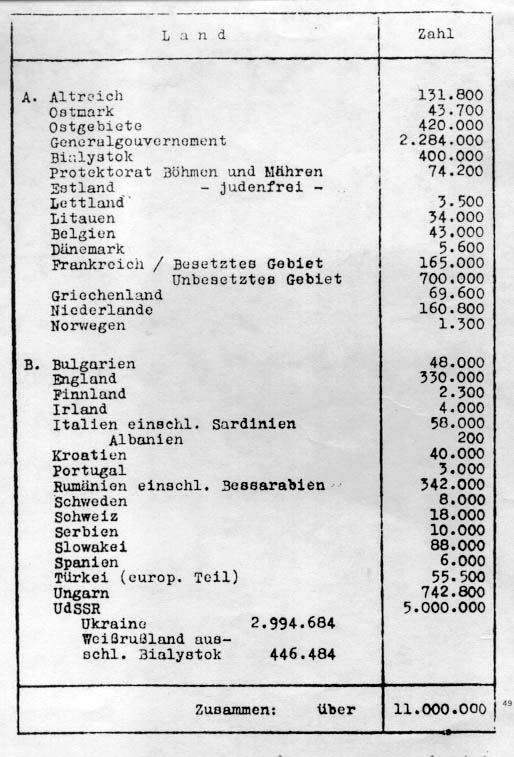
Eichmann's list of the Jewish population in Europe, drafted for the Wannsee Conference, held to ensure the cooperation of various levels of the Nazi government in the Final Solution

The Nazi party, which seized power in the 1933 German elections and maintained a dictatorship over much of Europe until the End of World War II on the European continent, deemed the Germans to be part of an Aryan "master race" (Herrenvolk), who therefore had the right to expand their territory and enslave or kill members of other races deemed inferior.

Adolf Hitler's 1925 memoir Mein Kampf was full of admiration for America's treatment of "coloreds". Nazi praise for America's institutional racism was continuous throughout the early 1930s, and Nazi lawyers were advocates of the use of American models. Race-based U.S. citizenship laws and anti-miscegenation laws (no race mixing) directly inspired the Nazi's two principal Nuremberg racial laws—the Citizenship Law and the Blood Law. Nazi expansion eastward was accompanied with invocation of America's colonial expansion westward, with the accompanying actions toward the Native Americans. In 1928, Hitler praised Americans for having "gunned down the millions of Redskins to a few hundred thousand, and now keeps the modest remnant under observation in a cage." On Nazi Germany's expansion eastward, in 1941 Hitler stated, "Our Mississippi [the line beyond which Thomas Jefferson wanted all Indians expelled] must be the Volga."

The racial ideology conceived by the Nazis graded humans on a scale of pure Aryan to non-Aryan, with the latter viewed as subhuman. At the top of the scale of pure Aryans were Germans and other Germanic peoples including the Dutch, Scandinavians, and the English as well as other peoples such as some northern Italians and the French, who were said to have a suitable admixture of Germanic blood. Nazi policies labeled Romani people, people of color, and Slavs (mainly Poles, Serbs, Russians, Belarusians, Ukrainians and Czechs) as inferior non-Aryan subhumans. Jews were at the bottom of the hierarchy, considered inhuman and thus unworthy of life. In accordance with Nazi racial ideology, approximately six million Jews were killed in the Holocaust. 2.5 million ethnic Poles, 0.5 million ethnic Serbs and 0.2–0.5 million Romani were killed by the regime and its collaborators.

The Nazis considered most Slavs to be non-Aryan Untermenschen. The Nazi Party's chief racial theorist, Alfred Rosenberg, adopted the term from Klansman Lothrop Stoddard's 1922 book The Revolt Against Civilization: The Menace of the Under-man. In the secret plan Generalplan Ost ("Master Plan East") the Nazis resolved to expel, enslave, or exterminate most Slavic people to provide "living space" for Germans, but Nazi policy towards Slavs changed during World War II due to manpower shortages which necessitated limited Slavic participation in the Waffen-SS. Significant war crimes were committed against Slavs, particularly Poles, and Soviet POWs had a far higher mortality rate than their American and British counterparts due to deliberate neglect and mistreatment. Between June 1941 and January 1942, the Nazis killed an estimated 2.8 million Red Army POWs, whom they viewed as "subhuman".

In the years 1943–1945, around 120,000 Polish people, mostly women and children, became the victims of ethnicity-based massacres by the Ukrainian Insurgent Army, which was then operating in the territory of occupied Poland. In addition to Poles who represented the vast majority of the murdered people, the victims also included Jews, Armenians, Russians, and Ukrainians who were married to Poles or attempted to help them.

During the intensification of ties with Nazi Germany in the 1930s, Ante Pavelić and the Ustaše and their idea of the Croatian nation became increasingly race-oriented. The Ustaše view of national and racial identity, as well as the theory of Serbs as an inferior race, was influenced by Croatian nationalists and intellectuals from the end of the 19th and the beginning of the 20th century. Serbs were primary targets of racial laws and murders in the puppet Independent State of Croatia (NDH); Jews and Roma were also targeted. The Ustaše introduced laws to strip Serbs of their citizenship, livelihoods, and possessions. During the genocide in the NDH, Serbs suffered among the highest casualty rates in Europe during the World War II, and the NDH was one of the most lethal regimes in the 20th century.

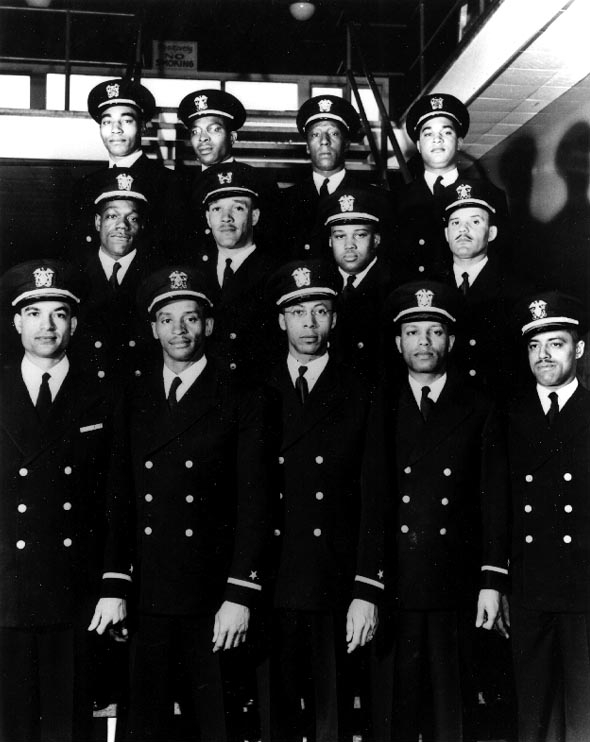
The Golden Thirteen, photographed on 17 March 1944. The navy class consisted of 16 African American men who were selected for navy training. Initially passing the training courses with outstanding scores, the group faced overt discrimination from by the US Navy and were forced to resit their exams due to pervasive racism.

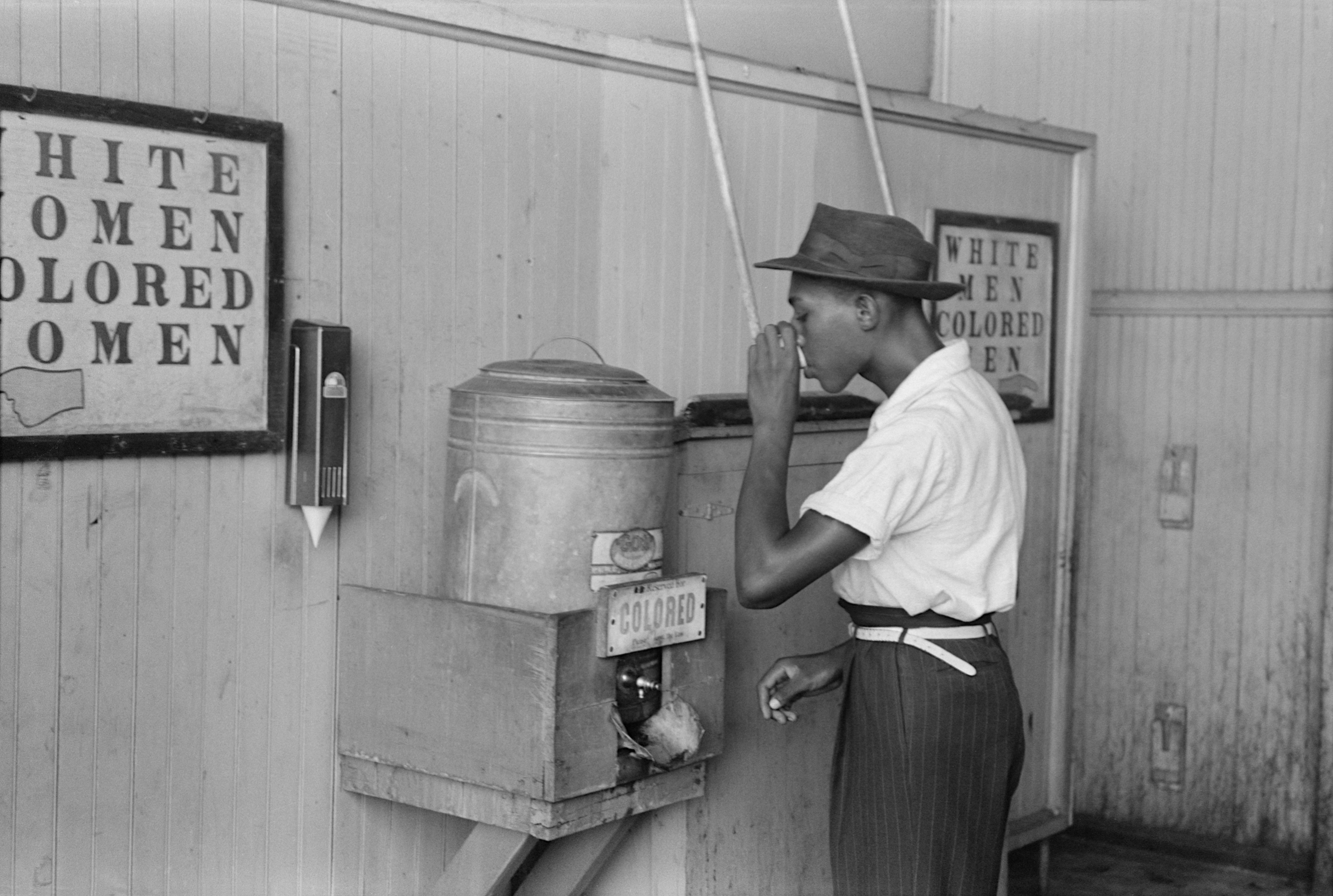
A drinking fountain from the mid-20th century labelled "Colored" with an African American man drinking

A sign posted above a bar that reads "No beer sold to Indians [Native Americans]". Birney, Montana, 1941.

White supremacy was dominant in the US from its founding up to the civil rights movement. On the US immigration laws prior to 1965, sociologist Stephen Klineberg cited the law as clearly declaring "that Northern Europeans are a superior subspecies of the white race." While anti-Asian racism was embedded in US politics and culture in the early 20th century, Indians were also racialized for their anticolonialism, with US officials, casting them as a "Hindu" menace, pushing for Western imperial expansion abroad. The Naturalization Act of 1790 limited US citizenship to whites only, and in the 1923 case, United States v. Bhagat Singh Thind, the Supreme Court ruled that high caste Hindus were not "white persons" and were therefore racially ineligible for naturalized citizenship. It was after the Luce–Celler Act of 1946 that a quota of 100 Indians per year could immigrate to the U.S. and become citizens. The Immigration and Nationality Act of 1965 dramatically opened entry to the US to immigrants other than traditional Northern European and Germanic groups, and as a result would significantly alter the demographic mix in the US.

Serious race riots in Durban between Indians and Zulus erupted in 1949. Ne Win's rise to power in Burma in 1962 and his relentless persecution of "resident aliens" led to an exodus of some 300,000 Burmese Indians. They migrated to escape racial discrimination and wholesale nationalisation of private enterprises a few years later, in 1964. The Zanzibar Revolution of 12 January 1964, put an end to the local Arab dynasty. Thousands of Arabs and Indians in Zanzibar were massacred in riots, and thousands more were detained or fled the island. In August 1972, Ugandan President Idi Amin started the expropriation of properties owned by Asians and Europeans. In the same year, Amin ethnically cleansed Uganda's Asians, giving them 90 days to leave the country. Shortly after World War II, the South African National Party took control of the government in South Africa. Between 1948 and 1994, the apartheid regime took place. This regime based its ideology on the racial separation of whites and non-whites, including the unequal rights of non-whites. Several protests and violence occurred during the struggle against apartheid, the most famous of these include the Sharpeville Massacre in 1960, the Soweto uprising in 1976, the Church Street bombing of 1983, and the Cape Town peace march of 1989.

=== Contemporary ===
During the Congo Civil War (1998–2003), Pygmy people were hunted down like game animals and eaten. Both sides in the war regarded them as "subhuman" and some say their flesh can confer magical powers. UN human rights activists reported in 2003 that rebels had carried out acts of cannibalism. Sinafasi Makelo, a representative of the Mbuti pygmies, has asked the UN Security Council to recognise cannibalism as both a crime against humanity and an act of genocide. A report released by the United Nations Committee on the Elimination of Racial Discrimination condemns Botswana's treatment of the 'Bushmen' as racist. In 2008, the tribunal of the 15-nation Southern African Development Community (SADC) accused Zimbabwean President Robert Mugabe of having a racist attitude towards white people.

The mass demonstrations and riots against African students in Nanjing, China, lasted from December 1988 to January 1989. In November 2009, British newspaper The Guardian reported that Lou Jing, of mixed Chinese and African parentage, had emerged as the most famous talent show contestant in China and has become the subject of intense debate because of her skin color. Her attention in the media opened serious debates about racism in China and racial prejudice.

Some 70,000 black African Mauritanians were expelled from Mauritania in the late 1980s. In the Sudan, black African captives in the civil war were often enslaved, and female prisoners were often sexually abused. The Darfur conflict has been described by some as a racial matter. In October 2006, Niger announced that it would deport the approximately 150,000 Arabs living in the Diffa region of eastern Niger to Chad. While the government collected Arabs in preparation for the deportation, two girls died, reportedly after fleeing Government forces, and three women suffered miscarriages.

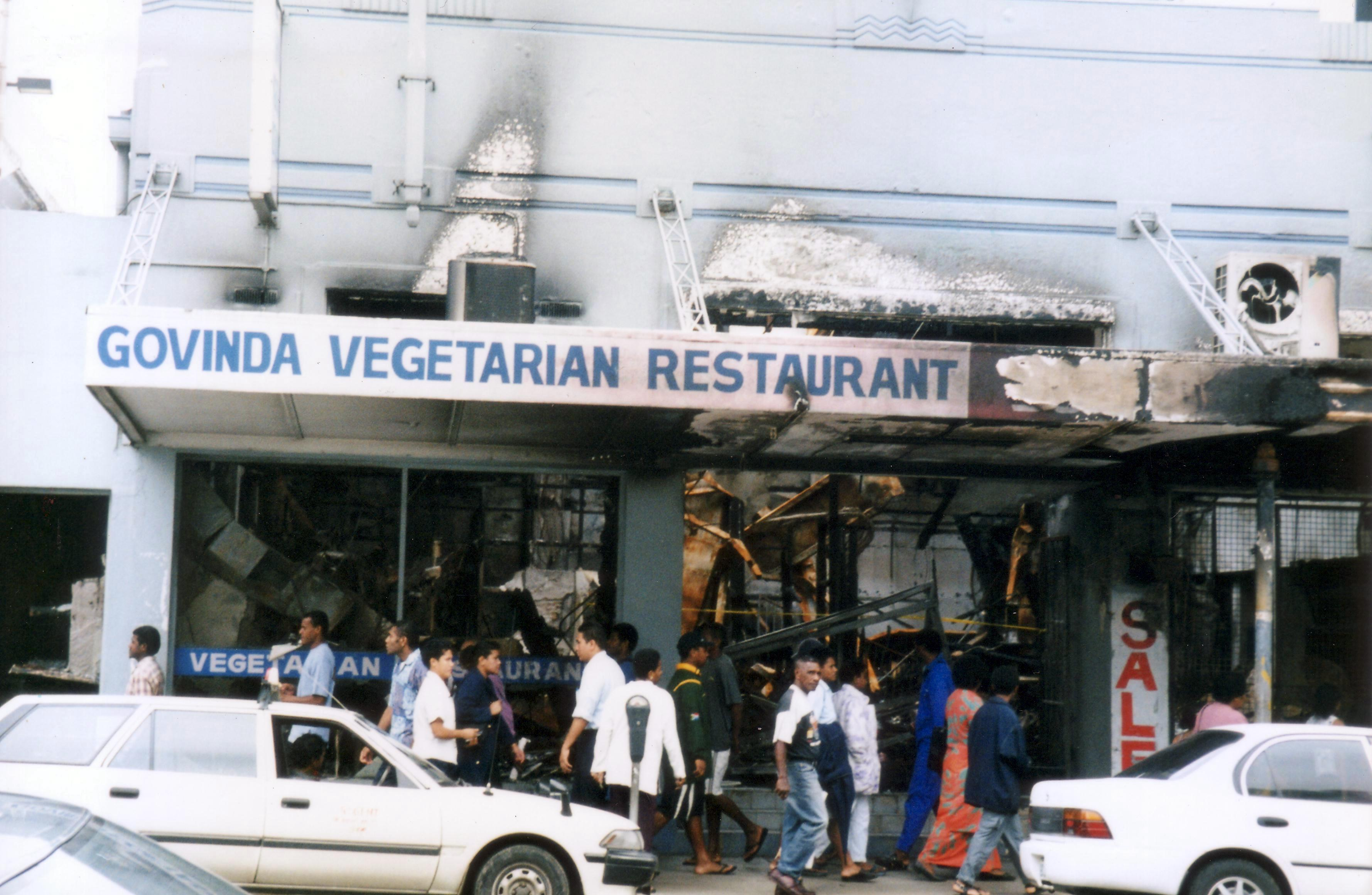
The burnt out remains of Govinda's Indian Restaurant in Fiji, May 2000

The Jakarta riots of May 1998 targeted many Chinese Indonesians. The anti-Chinese legislation was in the Indonesian constitution until 1998. Resentment against Chinese workers has led to violent confrontations in Africa and Oceania. Anti-Chinese rioting, involving tens of thousands of people, broke out in Papua New Guinea in May 2009. Indo-Fijians suffered violent attacks after the Fiji coup in 2000. Non-indigenous citizens of Fiji are subject to discrimination. Racial divisions also exist in Guyana, Malaysia, Trinidad and Tobago, Madagascar, and South Africa. In Malaysia such racist state policies are codified on many levels, see Bumiputera.

Peter Bouckaert, the Human Rights Watch's emergencies director, said in an interview that "racist hatred" is the chief motivation behind the violence against Rohingya Muslims in Myanmar.

One form of racism in the United States was enforced racial segregation, which existed until the 1960s, when it was outlawed in the Civil Rights Act of 1964. It has been argued that this separation of races continues to exist de facto today in different forms, such as lack of access to loans and resources or discrimination by police and other government officials.

The 2016 Pew Research poll found that Italians, in particular, hold strong anti-Romani views, with 82% of Italians expressing negative opinions about Romani. In Greece, there are 67%, in Hungary, 64%, in France, 61%, in Spain, 49%, in Poland, 47%, in the UK, 45%, in Sweden, 42%, in Germany, 40%, and in the Netherlands, 37%, that have an unfavourable view of Roma. A survey conducted by Harvard University found the Czech Republic, Lithuania, Belarus, and Ukraine had the strongest racial bias against black people in Europe, while Serbia, Slovenia, and Bosnia and Herzegovina had the weakest racial bias, followed by Croatia and Ireland.

A 2023 University of Cambridge survey which featured the largest sample of black people in Britain found that 88% had reported racial discrimination at work, 79% believed the police unfairly targeted black people with stop and search powers and 80% definitely or somewhat agreed that the biggest barrier to academic attainment for young Black students was racial discrimination in education.

== Scientific racism ==
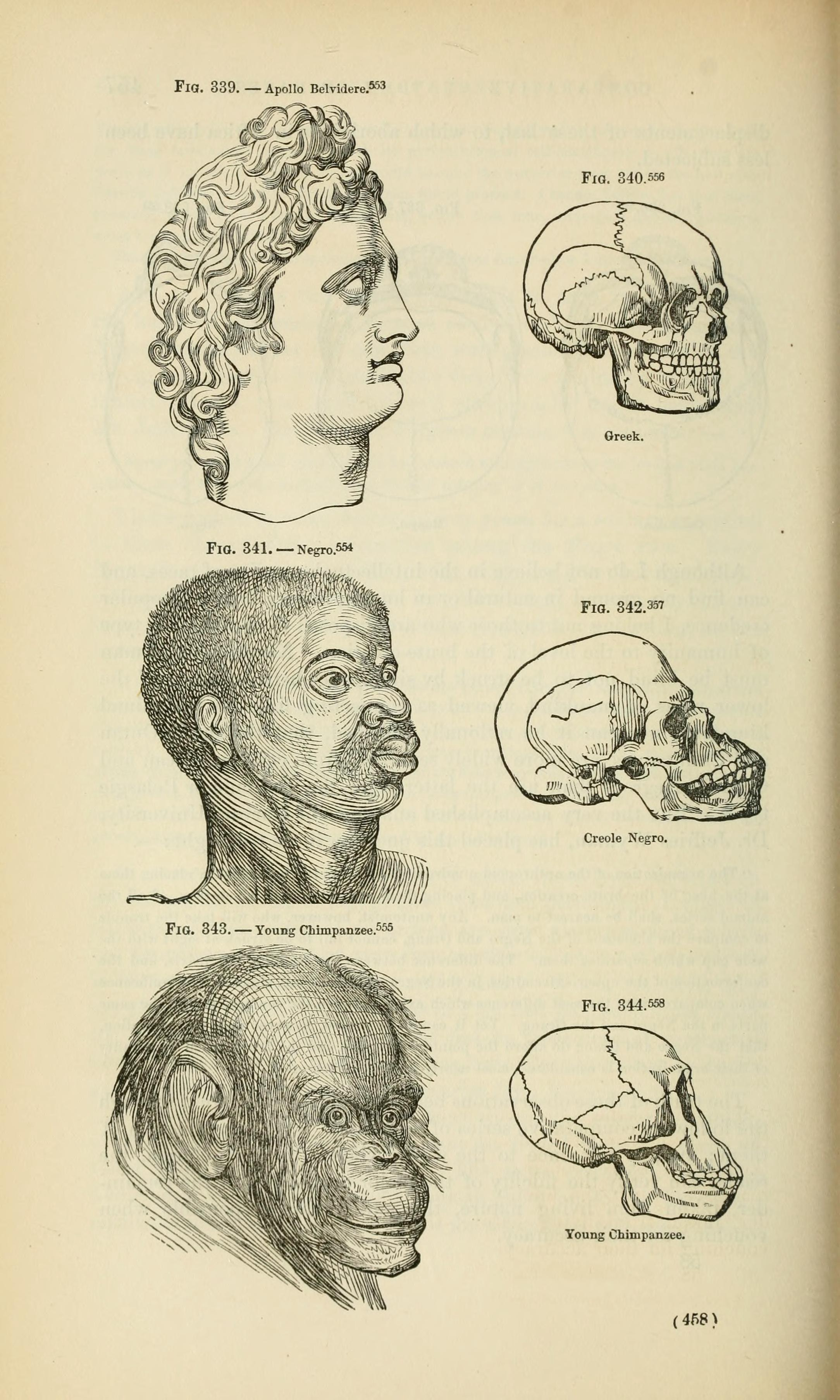
Drawings from Josiah C. Nott and George Gliddon's Indigenous races of the earth (1857), which suggested black people ranked between white people and chimpanzees in terms of intelligence

The modern biological definition of race developed in the 19th century with scientific racist theories. The term scientific racism refers to the use of science to justify and support racist beliefs, which goes back to the early 18th century, though it gained most of its influence in the mid-19th century, during the New Imperialism period. Also known as academic racism, such theories first needed to overcome the Church's resistance to positivist accounts of history and its support of monogenism, the concept that all human beings were originated from the same ancestors, in accordance with creationist accounts of history.

These racist theories put forth on scientific hypothesis were combined with unilineal theories of social progress, which postulated the superiority of the European civilization over the rest of the world. Furthermore, they frequently made use of the idea of "survival of the fittest", a term coined by Herbert Spencer in 1864, associated with ideas of competition, which were named social Darwinism in the 1940s. Charles Darwin himself opposed the idea of rigid racial differences in The Descent of Man (1871), in which he argued that humans were all of one species, sharing common descent. He recognised racial differences as varieties of humanity, and emphasised the close similarities between people of all races in mental faculties, tastes, dispositions and habits, while still contrasting the culture of the "lowest savages" with European civilization.

At the end of the 19th century, proponents of scientific racism intertwined themselves with eugenics discourses of "degeneration of the race" and "blood heredity". Henceforth, scientific racist discourses could be defined as the combination of polygenism, unilinealism, social Darwinism, and eugenism. They found their scientific legitimacy on physical anthropology, anthropometry, craniometry, phrenology, physiognomy, and others now discredited disciplines in order to formulate racist prejudices.

Before being disqualified in the 20th century by the American school of cultural anthropology (Franz Boas, etc.), the British school of social anthropology (Bronisław Malinowski, Alfred Radcliffe-Brown, etc.), the French school of ethnology (Claude Lévi-Strauss, etc.), as well as the discovery of the neo-Darwinian synthesis, such sciences, in particular anthropometry, were used to deduce behaviours and psychological characteristics from outward, physical appearances.

The neo-Darwinian synthesis, first developed in the 1930s, eventually led to a gene-centered view of evolution in the 1960s. According to the Human Genome Project, the most complete mapping of human DNA to date indicates that there is no clear genetic basis to racial groups. While some genes are more common in certain populations, there are no genes that exist in all members of one population and no members of any other.

=== Heredity and eugenics ===
The first theory of eugenics was developed in 1869 by Francis Galton (1822–1911), who used the then-popular concept of degeneration. He applied statistics to study human differences and the alleged "inheritance of intelligence", foreshadowing future uses of "intelligence testing" by the anthropometry school. Such theories were vividly described by the writer Émile Zola (1840–1902), who started publishing in 1871, a twenty-novel cycle, Les Rougon-Macquart, where he linked heredity to behavior. Thus, Zola described the high-born Rougons as those involved in politics (Son Excellence Eugène Rougon) and medicine (Le Docteur Pascal) and the low-born Macquarts as those fatally falling into alcoholism (L'Assommoir), prostitution (Nana), and homicide (La Bête humaine).

During the rise of Nazism in Germany, some scientists in Western nations worked to debunk the regime's racial theories. A few argued against racist ideologies and discrimination, even if they believed in the alleged existence of biological races. However, in the fields of anthropology and biology, these were minority positions until the mid-20th century. According to the 1950 UNESCO statement, The Race Question, an international project to debunk racist theories had been attempted in the mid-1930s. However, this project had been abandoned. Thus, in 1950, UNESCO declared that it had resumed:

...up again, after a lapse of fifteen years, a project that the International Committee on Intellectual Cooperation has wished to carry through but that it had to abandon in deference to the appeasement policy of the pre-war period. The race question had become one of the pivots of Nazi ideology and policy. Masaryk and Beneš took the initiative of calling for a conference to re-establish in the minds and consciences of men everywhere the truth about race ... Nazi propaganda was able to continue its baleful work unopposed by the authority of an international organisation.

The Third Reich's racial policies, its eugenics programs and the extermination of Jews in the Holocaust, as well as the Romani people in the Porrajmos (the Romani Holocaust) and others minorities led to a change in opinions about scientific research into race after the war. Changes within scientific disciplines, such as the rise of the Boasian school of anthropology in the United States contributed to this shift. These theories were strongly denounced in the 1950 UNESCO statement, signed by internationally renowned scholars, and titled The Race Question.

=== Polygenism and racial typologies ===
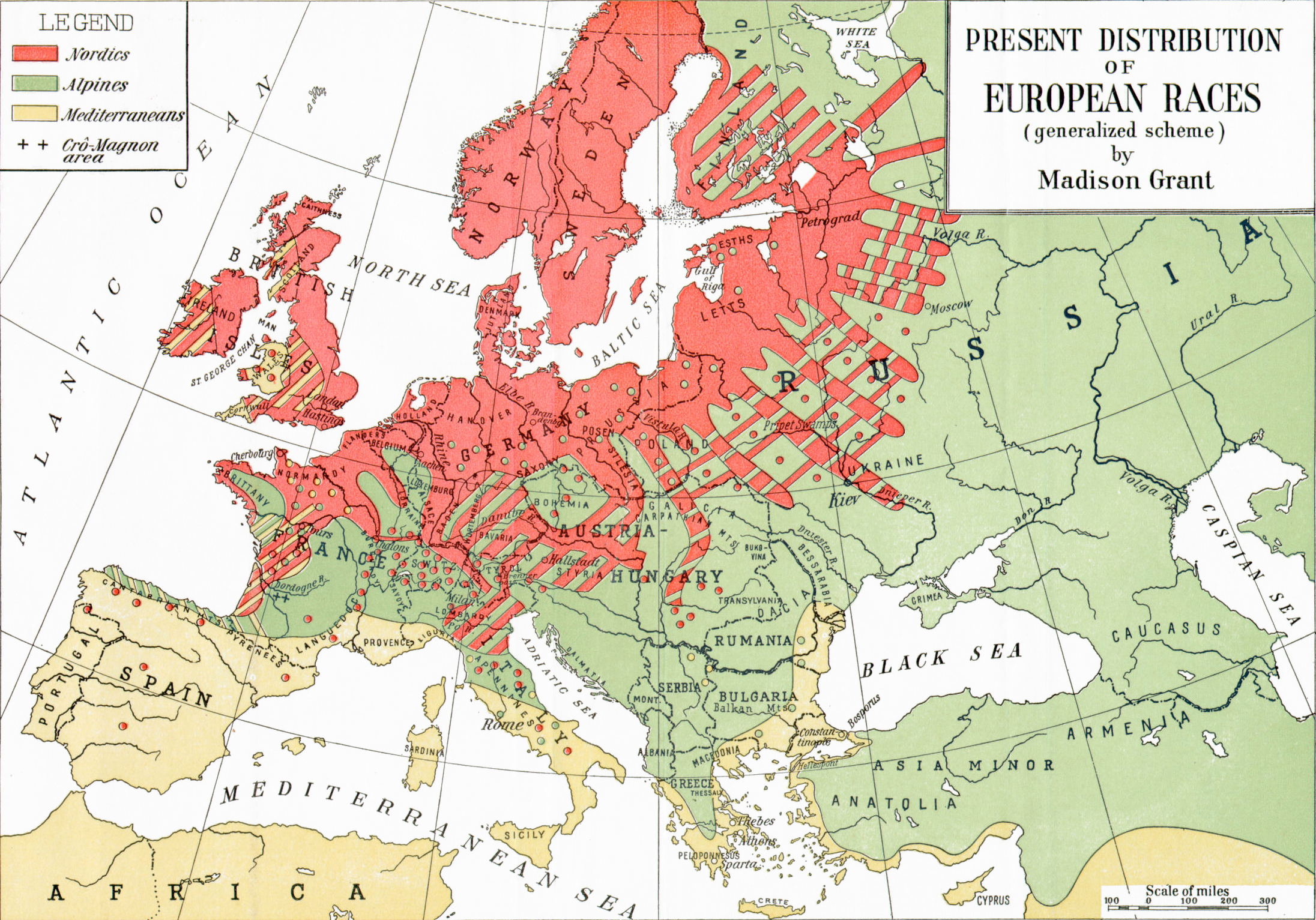
Madison Grant's map, from 1916, charting the "present distribution of European races", with the Nordics in red, the Alpines in green, and the Mediterraneans in yellow

Works such as Arthur de Gobineau's An Essay on the Inequality of the Human Races (1853–1855) may be considered one of the first theorizations of this new racism, founded on an essentialist notion of race, which opposed the former racial discourse, of Boulainvilliers for example, which saw in races a fundamentally historical reality, which changed over time. Gobineau, thus, attempted to frame racism within the terms of biological differences among humans, giving it the legitimacy of biology.

Gobineau's theories would be expanded in France by Georges Vacher de Lapouge (1854–1936)'s typology of races, who published in 1899 The Aryan and his Social Role, in which he claimed that the white "Aryan race" "dolichocephalic", was opposed to the "brachycephalic" race, of whom the "Jew" was the archetype. Vacher de Lapouge thus created a hierarchical classification of races, in which he identified the "Homo europaeus (Teutonic, Protestant, etc.), the "Homo alpinus" (Auvergnat, Turkish, etc.), and finally the "Homo mediterraneus" (Neapolitan, Andalus, etc.) He assimilated races and social classes, considering that the French upper class was a representation of the Homo europaeus, while the lower class represented the Homo alpinus. Applying Galton's eugenics to his theory of races, Vacher de Lapouge's "selectionism" aimed first at achieving the annihilation of trade unionists, considered to be a "degenerate"; second, creating types of man each destined to one end, in order to prevent any contestation of labour conditions. His "anthroposociology" thus aimed at blocking social conflict by establishing a fixed, hierarchical social order.

The same year, William Z. Ripley used identical racial classification in The Races of Europe (1899), which would have a great influence in the United States. Other scientific authors include H.S. Chamberlain at the end of the 19th century (a British citizen who naturalized himself as German because of his admiration for the "Aryan race") and Madison Grant, a eugenicist and author of The Passing of the Great Race (1916). Madison Grant provided statistics for the Immigration Act of 1924, which severely restricted immigration of Jews, Slavs, and Southern Europeans, who were subsequently hindered in seeking to escape Nazi Germany.

=== Human zoos ===
Human zoos (called "People Shows"), were an important means of bolstering popular racism by connecting it to scientific racism: they were both objects of public curiosity and of anthropology and anthropometry. Joice Heth, an African American slave, was displayed by P. T. Barnum in 1836, a few years after the exhibition of Saartjie Baartman, the "Hottentot Venus", in England. Such exhibitions became common in the New Imperialism period, and remained so until World War II. Carl Hagenbeck, inventor of the modern zoos, exhibited animals beside humans who were considered "savages".

Congolese pygmy Ota Benga was displayed in 1906 by eugenicist Madison Grant, head of the Bronx Zoo, as an attempt to illustrate the "missing link" between humans and orangutans: thus, racism was tied to Darwinism, creating a social Darwinist ideology that tried to ground itself in Darwin's scientific discoveries. The 1931 Paris Colonial Exhibition displayed Kanaks from New Caledonia. A "Congolese village" was on display as late as 1958 at the Brussels' World Fair.

== Theories about the origins of racism ==
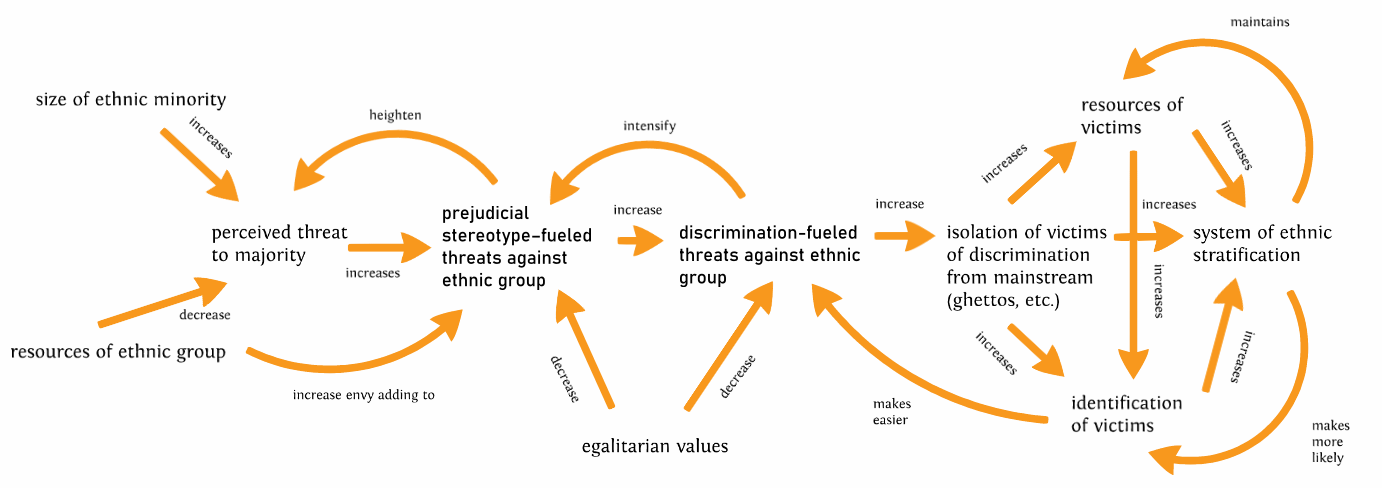
Sociological model of ethnic and racial conflict

Evolutionary psychologists John Tooby and Leda Cosmides were puzzled by the fact that in the US, race is one of the three characteristics most often used in brief descriptions of individuals (the others are age and sex). They reasoned that natural selection would not have favoured the evolution of an instinct for using race as a classification, because for most of human history, humans almost never encountered members of other races. Tooby and Cosmides hypothesized that modern people use race as a proxy (rough-and-ready indicator) for coalition membership, since a better-than-random guess about "which side" another person is on will be helpful if one does not actually know in advance.

Their colleague Robert Kurzban designed an experiment whose results appeared to support this hypothesis. Using the memory confusion protocol, they presented subjects with pictures of individuals and sentences, allegedly spoken by these individuals, which presented two sides of a debate. The errors that the subjects made in recalling who said what indicated that they sometimes mis-attributed a statement to a speaker of the same race as the "correct" speaker, although they also sometimes mis-attributed a statement to a speaker "on the same side" as the "correct" speaker. In a second run of the experiment, the team also distinguished the "sides" in the debate by clothing of similar colors; and in this case the effect of racial similarity in causing mistakes almost vanished, being replaced by the color of their clothing. In other words, the first group of subjects, with no clues from clothing, used race as a visual guide to guessing who was on which side of the debate; the second group of subjects used the clothing color as their main visual clue, and the effect of race became very small.

Some research suggests that ethnocentric thinking may have actually contributed to the development of cooperation. Political scientists Ross Hammond and Robert Axelrod created a computer simulation wherein virtual individuals were randomly assigned one of a variety of skin colors, and then one of a variety of trading strategies: be color-blind, favor those of your own color, or favor those of other colors. They found that the ethnocentric individuals clustered together, then grew, until all the non-ethnocentric individuals were wiped out.

In The Selfish Gene, evolutionary biologist Richard Dawkins writes that "Blood-feuds and inter-clan warfare are easily interpretable in terms of Hamilton's genetic theory." Dawkins writes that racial prejudice, while not evolutionarily adaptive, "could be interpreted as an irrational generalization of a kin-selected tendency to identify with individuals physically resembling oneself, and to be nasty to individuals different in appearance." Simulation-based experiments in evolutionary game theory have attempted to provide an explanation for the selection of ethnocentric-strategy phenotypes.

Despite support for evolutionary theories relating to an innate origin of racism, various studies have suggested racism is associated with lower intelligence and less diverse peer groups during childhood. A neuroimaging study on amygdala activity during racial matching activities found increased activity to be associated with adolescent age as well as less racially diverse peer groups, which the author conclude suggest a learned aspect of racism. A meta-analysis of neuroimaging studies found amygdala activity correlated to increased scores on implicit measures of racial bias. It was also argued amygdala activity in response to racial stimuli represents increased threat perception rather than the traditional theory of the amygdala activity represented ingroup-outgroup processing. Racism has also been associated with lower childhood IQ in an analysis of 15,000 people in the UK.

== Psychological causes ==
A 2017 study in the American Political Science Review found that prejudice towards marginalized groups, such as refugees, could be explained by a failure to take the perspective of the marginalized group. The study found that young Hungarian adults who played a perspective-taking game (a game intended to reduce prejudice towards marginalized groups by having players assume the role of a member of a marginalized group) showed reduced prejudice towards Romani people and refugees, as well as reduced their vote intentions for Hungary's overtly racist, far right party by 10%.

== State-sponsored racism ==
State racism—the institutions and practices of a nation-state that are grounded in racist ideology—has played a major role in all instances of settler colonialism, from the United States to Australia. It also played a prominent role in the Nazi German regime, in fascist regimes throughout Europe, and during the early years of Japan's Shōwa period. These governments advocated and implemented ideologies and policies that were racist, xenophobic, and, in the case of Nazism, genocidal.

The Nuremberg Race Laws of 1935 prohibited sexual relations between any Aryan and Jew, considering it Rassenschande, "racial pollution". The Nuremberg Laws stripped all Jews, even quarter- and half-Jews (second and first degree Mischlings), of their German citizenship. This meant that they had no basic citizens' rights, e.g., the right to vote. In 1936, Jews were banned from all professional jobs, effectively preventing them from having any influence in education, politics, higher education, and industry. On 15 November 1938, Jewish children were banned from going to normal schools. By April 1939, nearly all Jewish companies had either collapsed under financial pressure and declining profits, or had been persuaded to sell out to the Nazi government. This further reduced their rights as human beings; they were in many ways officially separated from the German populace. Similar laws existed in Bulgaria (The Law for protection of the nation), Hungary, Romania, and Austria.

Legislative state racism is known to have been enforced by the National Party of South Africa during its Apartheid regime between 1948 and 1994. Here, a series of Apartheid legislation was passed through the legal systems to make it legal for white South Africans to have rights which were superior to those of non-white South Africans. Non-white South Africans were not allowed involvement in any governing matters, including voting; access to quality healthcare; the provision of basic services, including clean water; electricity; as well as access to adequate schooling. Non-white South Africans were also prevented from accessing certain public areas, from using certain public transportation, and were required to live only in certain designated areas. Non-white South Africans were taxed differently than white South Africans and they were also required to carry on them at all times additional documentation, which later became known as "dom passes", to certify their non-white South African citizenship. All of these legislative racial laws were abolished through a series of equal human rights laws which were passed at the end of the Apartheid era in the early 1990s.

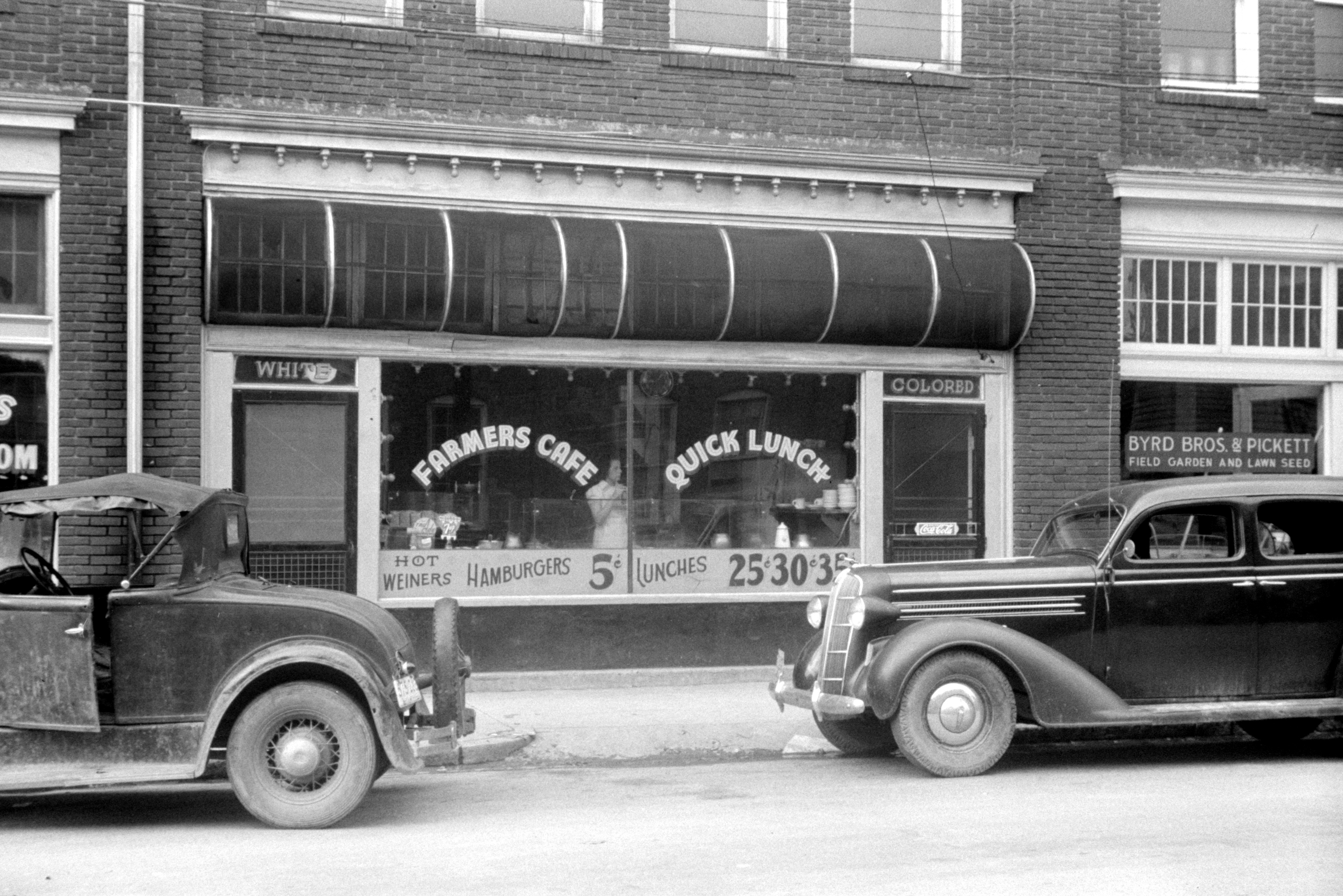
Separate "white" and "colored" entrances to a café in North Carolina, 1940

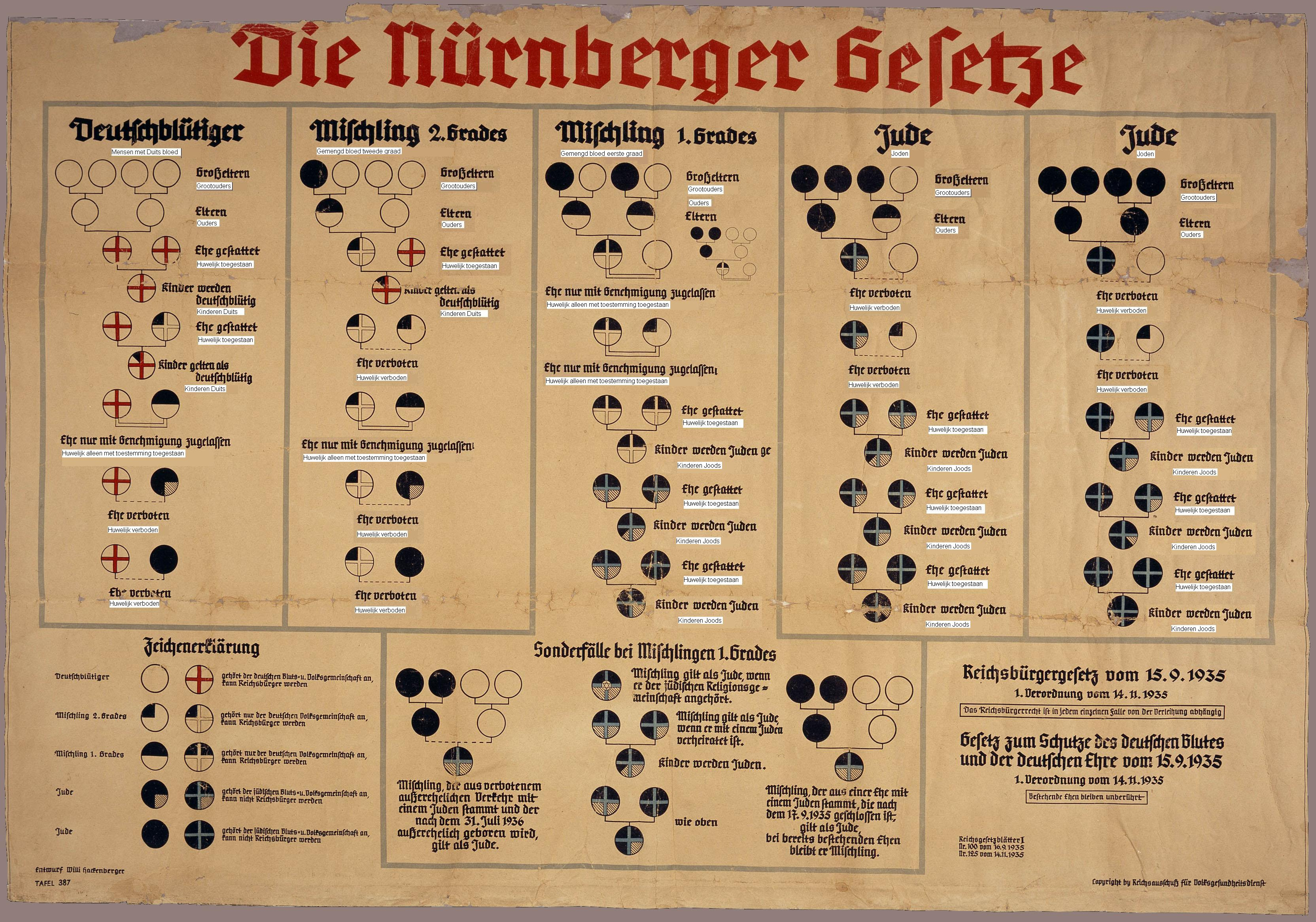
1935 Chart from Nazi Germany used to explain the Nuremberg Laws, defining which Germans were to be considered Jews and stripped of their citizenship. Germans with three or more Jewish grandparents were defined as Jews, Germans with one or two Jewish grandparents were deemed Mischling (mixed-blood).

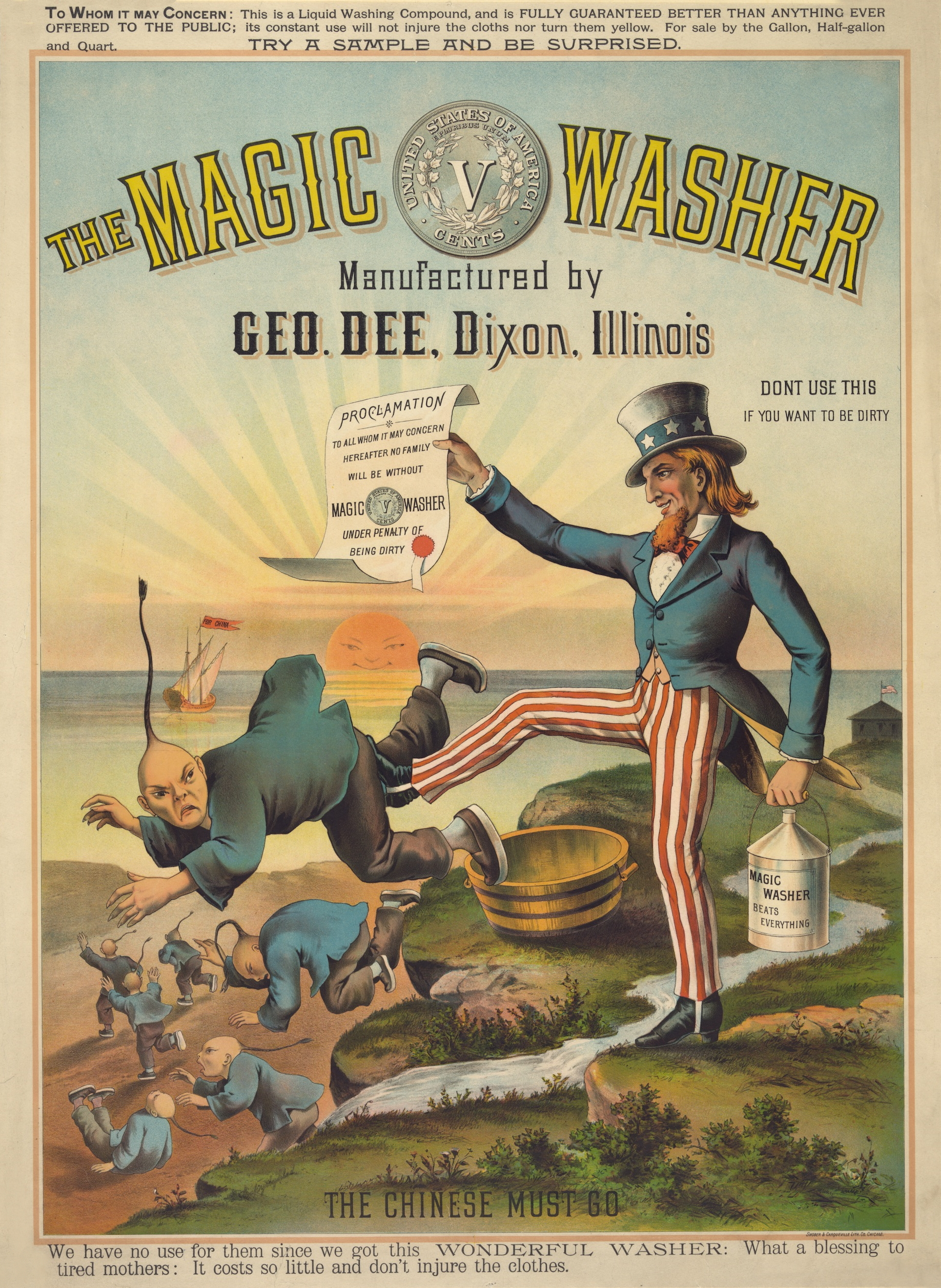
19th century political cartoon: Uncle Sam kicks out the Chinaman, referring to the Chinese Exclusion Act

== Anti-racism ==
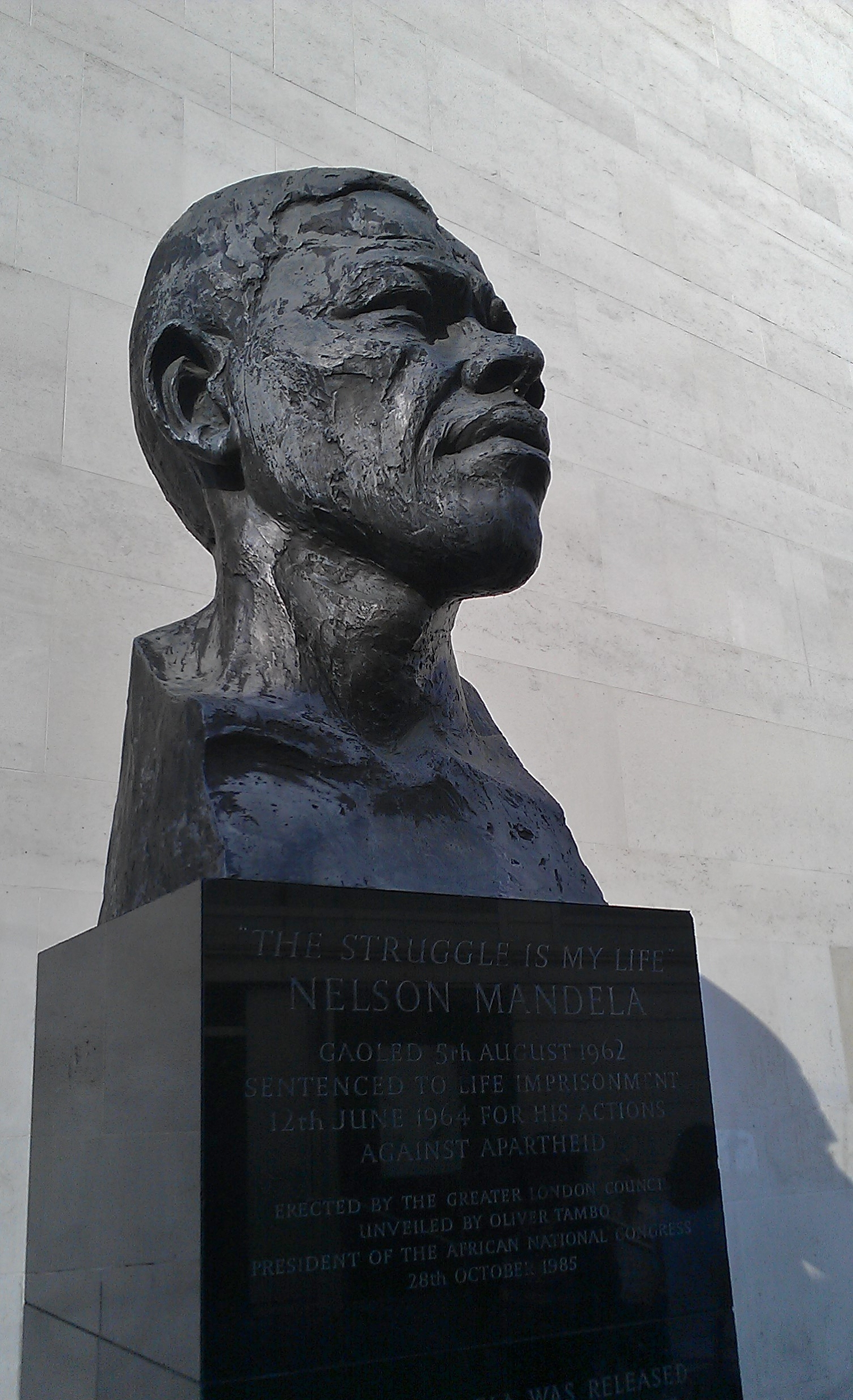
Bust of Nelson Mandela erected on London's South Bank. Mandela is widely considered a global hero for his role in opposing the apartheid system and inaugurating a multiracial democracy.

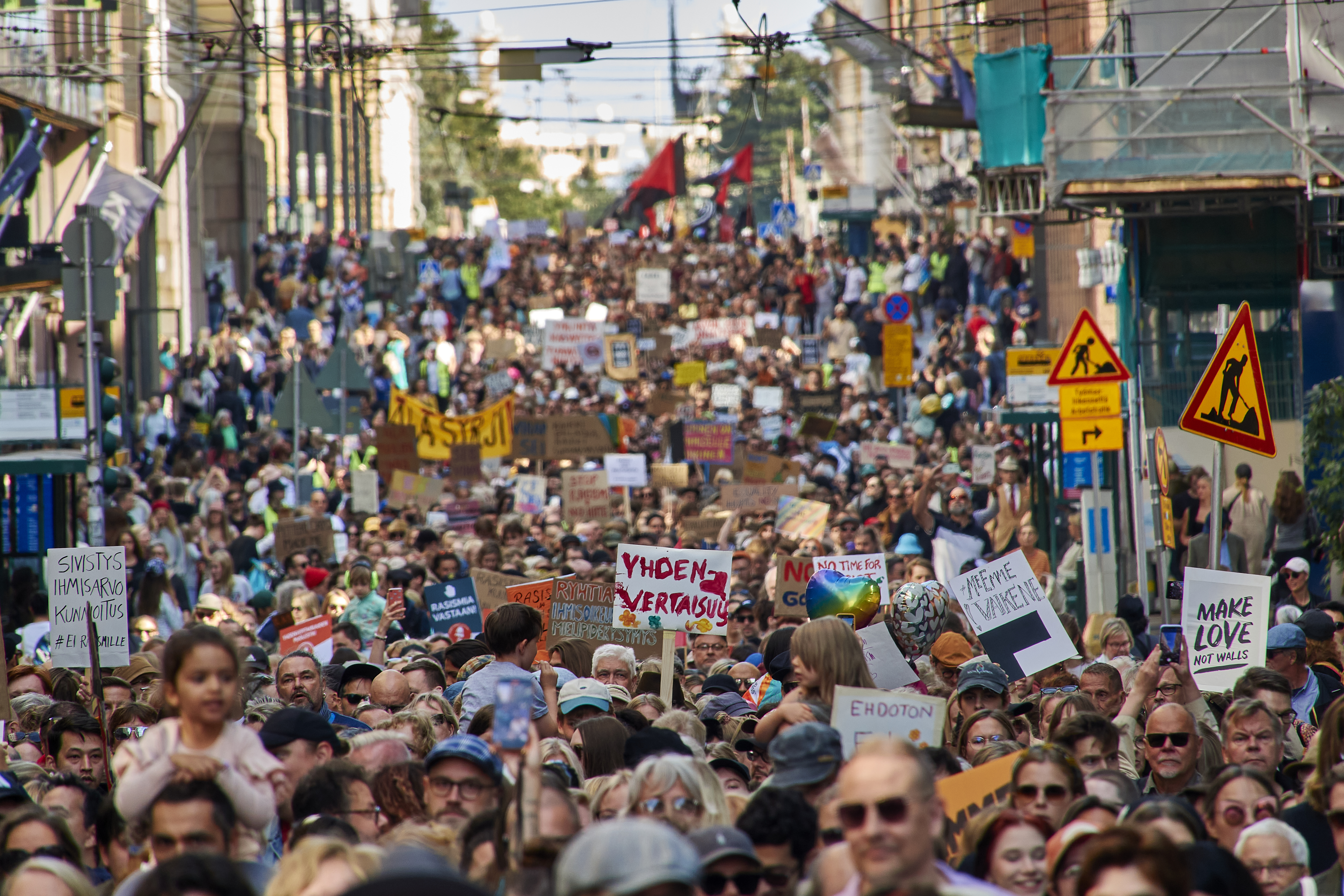
Demonstration against racism in Helsinki, Finland 2023

Anti-racism includes beliefs, actions, scholarship, movements, and policies which are adopted or developed in order to oppose racism. In general, it promotes an egalitarian society in which people are not discriminated against on the basis of race. Examples of anti-racist movements include the civil rights movement, the Anti-Apartheid Movement and Black Lives Matter. Nonviolent resistance is sometimes embraced as an element of anti-racist movements, although this was not always the case. Hate crime laws, affirmative action, and bans on racist speech are also examples of government policy which is intended to suppress racism.

== See also ==
- Afrophobia
- Allport's Scale
- Anti-Black racism
- Anti-white racism
- Aporophobia
- Christian Identity
- Covert racism
- Creativity (religion)
- Curse and mark of Cain
- Curse of Ham
- Discrimination based on skin color
- Environmental racism
- Environmental racism in Europe
- Ethnic hatred
- Hate crime
- Hate speech
- Hipster racism
- Historical trauma
- Identitarianism
- Index of racism-related articles
- In-group favoritism
- Internalized racism
- Labeling theory
- Minority stress
- Nigger
- Racial bias in criminal news
- Racial bias on Wikipedia
- Racial fetishism
- Racial literacy
- Racialization
- Raciolinguistics
- Racist pre-Adamism
- Racism in horror films
- Racism in the LGBT community
- Redlining
- Romantic racism
- Social interpretations of race
- Speciesism
- Stereotype threat
- Tatarophobia
- Tragic mulatto
- Yellow Peril
- Xenophobia and racism in the Middle East
