= Typology (anthropology) =

Typology in anthropology was the categorization of the human species by races, based solely on traits that are readily observable from a distance such as head shape, skin color, hair form, body build, and stature. During the late 19th and early 20th centuries, anthropologists used a typological model to divide people from different ethnic regions into races, (e.g. the Negroid race, the Caucasoid race, the Mongoloid race, the Australoid race, and the Capoid race which was the racial classification system as defined in 1962 by Carleton S. Coon).

The typological model was built on the assumption that humans can be assigned to a race based on similar physical traits. However, author Dennis O'Neil says the typological model in anthropology is now thoroughly discredited. Current mainstream thinking is that the morphological traits are due to simple variations in specific regions, and are the effect of climatic selective pressures. This debate is covered in more detail in the article on race.

== See also ==
- Racial Mapping
- Craniometry
- Craniofacial anthropometry
