= Memory confusion protocol =

Psychological technique

The memory confusion protocol is a technique used by social psychologists to discover whether subjects are categorizing individuals into groups and, if so, what characteristics they are using to do so – without the knowledge of the subjects, in order to reduce the risk that subjects will try to conceal their reasons. The technique has three main steps:

1. Subjects are shown photographs of the individuals and are asked to form impressions of them.
2. The subjects then see a set of sentences, each of which is paired with a photograph of the individual who said it.
3. Subjects are not forewarned of the final step, a surprise recall task: the sentences are presented in random order, and the subjects must attribute each to the correct individual.

The subjects' mistakes in the recall task reveal how they categorize the individuals: the subjects are more likely to misattribute A's statement to B if they grouped A and B as members of the same category than if they considered them members of different categories.
