= Felix Senac =

Confederate States Navy agent to Europe

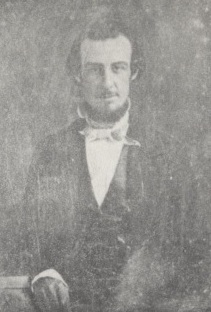
- Senac photographed c. 1853

Confederate States Navy Agent to Europe

Personal details
- Born: July 28, 1815 Pensacola, Florida, U.S.
- Died: January 27, 1866 (aged 50) Wiesbaden, Germany
- Spouse: Marie Louise Hollinger (m. 1841)
- Children: Ruby (daughter)

Felix Senac (July 28, 1815 – January 27, 1866) was a Confederate States Navy agent to Europe from 1862 to 1865.

A native of Pensacola, Florida, Senac married in Mobile, Alabama, and moved his family to Key West just prior to the American Civil War. In 1861 he tendered his resignation as Paymaster of the USS Susquehanna while the vessel was still in La Spezia, Italy. He would be paymaster of the Confederate navy in Europe until the end of the Civil War. He died in 1866 while in Wiesbaden, Germany. His daughter Ruby married the famous Confederate propagandist Henry Hotze in 1867 in Paris.

Senac was related by marriage to Confederate States Navy secretary Stephen Mallory and Marine Corps 2nd lieutenant John L. Rapier. In a letter to the Confederate agent James Dunwoody Bulloch, Mallory describes him thus: "He speaks French with purity and elegance, Spanish also, possesses fine business capacity, and is a gentleman of ripe judgement and rare merit".

== Early life ==
Felix Senac was born on July 28, 1815, in Spanish Pensacola to Pierre and Agnes (née Krebs) Senac of French New Orleans. In 1821, Florida became a U.S. territory and he subsequently became a U.S. citizen. His cousin Angela Moreno of Spanish descent, also born in 1815 in Pensacola, would later marry in 1838 Stephen Mallory, the future C.S. Navy secretary. In 1841, Senac married Marie Louise Hollinger in Mobile, Alabama, while serving as deputy postmaster in that city. Their only daughter, Ruby, would be born four years later in 1845. In 1852, Senac moved his family to Key West while overseeing the construction of Fort Taylor. In 1856 he was appointed purser in the United States Navy and moved his family to Washington, D.C. His daughter Ruby was a student at Georgetown Visitation school for girls. In 1857 he travelled south to Panama to meet the USS Decatur as its purser.

== American Civil War ==
Newspaper entry from 1866 on the death of Felix Senac in Wiesbaden, Germany

By September 1861, Senac had been appointed paymaster of the CSS Mississippi and CSS Louisiana, both being built in shipyards outside New Orleans. He was living with his family in New Orleans when the city fell to Union forces on April 26, 1862. The family had secured access to flee New Orleans and were living with other members of their family in Covington, Georgia. On September 15, 1862, Senac was summoned to Richmond, Virginia, in front of a Congressional Committee to explain the reasons for the loss of the two Confederate ironclads. Having received new instructions to operate as a C.S. Navy agent in Europe, Senac and his family left Wilmington, North Carolina, in June of 1863. Having reached London, the family ultimately settled in Paris as Senac traveled to England and around Europe trying to secure clothing, shoes, and weapons for the Confederacy. His ultimate goal had been to supervise and pay for the construction of the CSS Sphinx and the CSS Cheops. These ironclads had been given Egyptian names in the hope that U.S. spies would believe the ironclads were destined for the Khedive of Egypt. On February 28, 1865, as Confederate agents in Europe were slowly preparing to make their way back to the Confederacy, Senac received orders from Richmond to stay in Paris. In the summer of 1865 he moved with his family to Wiesbaden, Germany, and wrote his nephew that he would be traveling to South America to start a new life there. Senac died a few months later on January 27, 1866, in Wiesbaden and is buried there.

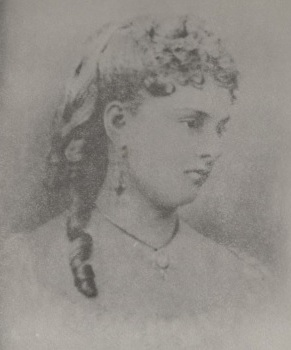
Ruby was Felix Senac's daughter and future wife of Henry Hotze (1867)

His wife and daughter Ruby left Wiesbaden for Paris where Ruby married the Confederate propagandist Henry Hotze in Paris in 1867. Following Hotze's death in 1887, Ruby survived her husband by several decades. She continued to live in England and then moved to Washington, D.C., with her mother Marie Louise who died on October 2, 1898. Ruby was employed in the U.S. Census Office on July 1, 1890, and then became a clerk in the Signal Corps. She was transferred to the U.S. Weather Bureau in 1891. She died on January 3, 1929, in Washington, D.C., at the age of 84. She is buried at Mount Olivet Cemetery.

== See also ==
- Diplomacy of the American Civil War
- Henry Hotze – Swiss-American agent of the Confederate States of America in England (1833–1887)
- Stephen Mallory – American politician (1812–1873)
