= Henry Hotze =

Swiss-American agent of the Confederate States of America in England (1833–1887)

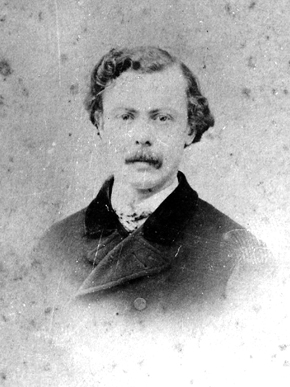
- Born: September 2, 1833; Zug, Switzerland
- Died: April 19, 1887 (aged 53); Zug, Switzerland
- Known for: Unofficial Diplomatic Agent of the Confederate States of America
- Spouse: Ruby Senac
- Parents: Rudolf Hotze (father); Sophie Essinger (mother)

Henry Hotze (September 2, 1833 – April 19, 1887) was a Swiss American advocate for the Confederate States of America during the American Civil War. He served as a Confederate agent in Great Britain, attempting to build support there for the Southern cause. Hotze used liberal arguments of self-determination in favor of national independence, echoing the failed European revolutions of 1848. He also promised that the Confederacy would be a low-tariff nation in contrast to the high-tariff United States, and he emphasized the consequences of cotton shortages for the industrial workers in Britain, caused by the Union blockade of Southern ports.

== Early life and career ==
Hotze was the son of Rudolph Hotze, a captain in the French Royal Service, and Sophie Esslinger. He was educated in a Jesuit setting and emigrated to the United States in his youth. He became a naturalized citizen in 1855, and lived in Mobile, Alabama, where he made important connections through his social skills and intelligence. He had strong racial opinions. In 1856 Hotze was hired by Josiah C. Nott to translate Joseph Arthur Comte de Gobineau's Essai sur l'inégalité des races humaines ("An Essay on the Inequality of the Human Races"), which was published as The Moral and Intellectual Diversity of Races.

In 1858, he went to the southern commercial convention as a delegate for Mobile. He was a secretary for the U.S. legation in Brussels in 1858 and 1859, and when he returned, he worked as an associate editor of the Mobile Register, owned by John Forsyth.

He joined the Mobile Cadets when the Civil War began. On May 30, 1861, he became a clerk in Richmond to the adjutant general. Secretary of War L. P. Walker ordered Hotze to go to London to assist in providing funds for Confederate agents in Europe, and help with the acquisition of munitions and supplies for the conflict. He went through the North and Canada before his departure, and collected some intelligence on the Union's mobilization efforts.

== Agent in Europe ==
The Index Newspaper

Hotze arrived in London on October 5 and came to the determination that the Confederacy needed a strong diplomatic and propaganda effort in Europe. He returned to Richmond and made his argument to the Confederate leadership. On November 14, he was created an agent with the core task of influencing British public opinion toward supporting the Confederacy. Hotze was given $750 by the Confederate government to influence the British press with pro-Confederate propaganda. Until the end of the war, he made substantial and vigorous activities to this end.

Hotze realized that propaganda effort had to be about more than cotton alone. He appealed to anti-American sentiment in the United Kingdom, British naval rights, and the rights of smaller nations. He paid English journalists to support the cause and wrote his own pieces in the Morning Post, the London Standard, the Herald, and the financial weekly paper Money and Market Review.

His first piece in the British press was published on February 23,1862, in the influential Morning Post, the newspaper loyal to then British Prime Minister Lord Palmerston.

In May 1862, he created a weekly journal, The Index, which was perhaps the best Confederate propaganda outlet in Europe. It had a circulation of around 2,000 and was distributed primarily in Britain, but was also read in France, Ireland, and even sent to the Union itself. Hotze's realism and subtlety in his propaganda differed from that of other Confederate agents in Europe like Edwin De Leon, James Williams, Felix Senac, John Slidell, and Paul Pecquet du Bellet.

With a total of sixteen pages, The Index appeared every week on Thursdays. The newspaper cost six pence and thirty shillings for an annual subscription. By the month of July 1864, though sales had been increasing very slowly since 1862, sales revenue of The Index finally became sufficient to amortize the total running costs of the paper. The offices of The Index were located on London's Fleet Street, two doors down from The London American, the official pro-Union propaganda journal.

Historian Frank E. Vandiver says of Hotze and The Index: "A brilliant editor, Hotze purveyed his point of view with good humored candor, and beyond his editorials offered readers a lively balanced paper. During its four-year life, the Index won many converts to its cause."

Contributors to The Index included British authors, as well as Americans living in London such as Albert Taylor Bledsoe and John Reuben Thompson.

According to Serge Noirsain of the Confederate Historical Association of Belgium, "Hotze called upon the assistance of professional journalists on the European continent. Filippo Manetta was a long-standing Italian friend of a member of the Confederate diplomatic mission in London, who had lived for a while in Virginia. Using the same methods as Hotze in England, Manetta managed to successfully infiltrate the Italian media, in particular the Turin press. This complicity produced a profitable exchange of information between The Index and the best newspapers on the European market.

When sources were available, Hotze developed topics that influenced or helped the Confederate envoys in their official missions. As a result, his columns in The Index and their echoes in other well-known newspapers helped consolidate the logic behind the policies of the South".

Hotze participated in a number of other important activities to support the south. He assisted in writing Lord Campbell's speech against the Union blockade given in the House of Lords on March 10, 1862. He also had an important dinner with William Ewart Gladstone (according to Gladstone's papers, July 31, 1862), where he stressed that the Union and Confederacy could negotiate their boundaries in a mediation effort. As 1862 moved on and after the battle of Antietam and the Emancipation Proclamation, Hotze became more frustrated over the course of public opinion in Great Britain.

In London, Hotze took under his wing the Confederate spy Belle Boyd, who had fled to England. Boyd had landed in Liverpool and made her way to London to meet Hotze, upon the recommendation of the Confederacy's Secretary of State. Boyd soon after married Union naval officer Samuel Wylde Hardinge in London on August 24, 1864. Though a shock to many, in light of the Civil War raging back home, the ceremony was nonetheless attended by influential Confederates such as Hotze, Caleb Huse, John Walker Fearn, John L. O'Sullivan (who had coined the phrase "Manifest Destiny") and James Williams. Both O'Sullivan and Williams had previously been US Ambassadors; O'Sullivan to Portugal and Williams to the Ottoman Empire.

== Last efforts and post-war activities ==
After the death of Stonewall Jackson prompted some sympathy for the south, Hotze attempted to organize pro-Confederacy meetings in Manchester, Sheffield, Preston and elsewhere to support a House of Commons resolution, initiated by J. A. Roebuck, for recognition of the Confederacy. Its failure and withdrawal on July 13, 1863, seemed to Hotze to be the end of hope for diplomatic solutions. When James M. Mason was withdrawn, Hotze was the only remaining agent for the Confederacy in Britain.

He continued to draw on negative sentiments related to Union actions against Confederate attempts to build ironclad ships in Britain and concerns over occasional Union actions against British shipping. He also worked to obtain signatures for petitions for peace and was able to influence French newspapers by affecting Havas Agency telegraphs.

According to Serge Noirsain,

[Hotze] took time to analyze the routing of information in France. He learned that it was the Havas Agency that spread the world news to the French press. By way of intrigues, he managed to make friends with Auguste Havas and convince him to exploit his exclusive information coming supposedly directly from the New World. Of course he took care not to reveal his true sources...In addition to France and Great Britain, Hotze was soon put in charge of Confederate propaganda in Ireland and in the German kingdoms. However, those nations had gradually passed under the control of Union agents who were provided with considerable funds. In spite of some local successes, Richmond advised Hotze not to focus on those areas because of the enormous amount of energy that this operation would require.

In the long run Hotze's strong feelings in favor of slavery made him loathe to work with Jefferson Davis, whose final offer to accept emancipation in exchange for European recognition he flatly rejected.

After the war, he refused to return to the United States and remained in Europe working as a journalist, mostly in Paris. He returned to London during the Franco-Prussian War and is known to have visited Istanbul for a newspaper assignment.

Shortly after the war, Hotze joined the rifle manufacturing company Martini, Tanner & Co. as senior partner. The company was later renamed Martini, Hotze, & Co. The company operated from the Rue de Lisbonne in Paris.

Hotze died of stomach cancer in Zug, Switzerland on April 19, 1887, at the age of 53.

== Marriage to Ruby Senac ==
Henry Hotze married Ruby Angela Senac in 1867 at the American Legation in Paris. A religious ceremony was held on December 7, 1867, at the Church of Saint Augustine in Paris by Rev. Crabod, 1st Vicar.

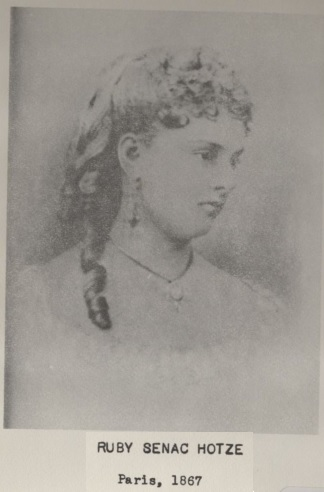
Henry Hotze's wife Ruby Senac Hotze photographed in 1867 in Paris, France

Funeral service for Ruby Senac Hotze

Ruby Senac, born in Mobile on January 4, 1844, was the daughter of Felix Senac and Marie Louise Hollinger. She had come to England with her parents in 1863 and had appeared at Court, being presented to Queen Victoria. Ruby had been educated in the United States and had attended Georgetown Visitation Academy in Washington until 1858. Her father Felix Senac, born in Pensacola on July 28, 1815, to Pierre Senac and Agnes Senac, had been the Confederacy's purchasing agent and paymaster in New Orleans and then Europe. Felix Senac, who had married Marie Louise Hollinger on April 16, 1843, began his military career in Florida in June 1834 before being dismissed as purser on August 15, 1856. Senac had been stationed on Key West's Fort Taylor as Chief Clerk in the 1850s, responsible for the construction and budget of the newly built Fort Taylor.

Felix Senac enlisted in the Confederate navy on July 22, 1861, and died on January 27, 1866, in Wiesbaden, Germany. His widow and daughter returned to Paris and it was there that Ruby first met Hotze. The Senacs were related to Angela Sylvania Moreno, the wife of Stephen Mallory, Secretary of the Navy of the Confederacy. The Senac family and Moreno family were related through Fernando Moreno (1771–1830), who had married Florentina Senac in 1788 in New Orleans, Louisiana. Felix Senac was also the maternal uncle of Confederate Second Lieutenant John Lawrence Rapier.

The Hotze couple and Ruby's mother lived in the St Mary Abbotts area of Kensington in 1871, and were still living in Kensington as late as 1881. Following Hotze's death in 1887, Ruby survived her husband by several decades. She continued to live in England and then moved to Washington, D.C., with her mother Marie Louise, who died on October 2, 1898. Ruby was employed in the Census Office on July 1, 1890, and then became a clerk in the Signal Corps. She was transferred to the Weather Bureau in 1891. She died on January 3, 1929, in Washington, D.C., at the age of 84. She is buried at Mount Olivet Cemetery.

== See also ==
- Diplomacy of the American Civil War
