= Crescent Theater =

Crescent Theater, Mobile, Alabama
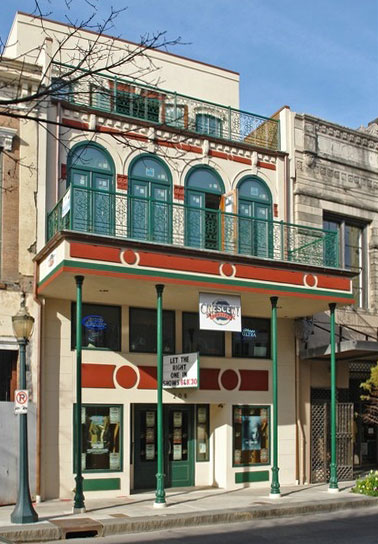
- Interactive map of Crescent Theater, Mobile, Alabama
- Address: 208 Dauphin St; Mobile, Alabama; United States
- Coordinates: 30.6915°N 88.0433°W
- Owner: Max Morey
- Capacity: 90
- Type: Film

Construction
- Opened: 1885
- Renovated: 2008
- Reopened: October 31, 2008
- Years active: 2008–2023

Website
- www.crescenttheater.com

The Crescent Theater was a single-screen movie theater located in Mobile, Alabama. The theater mainly shows independent and arthouse cinema, though several mainstream films have been included. It also operates as the home of local cinema and film competitions, and has been used for music and improvisational comedy. It was first opened in 1885 as the Crescent Theater for vaudeville entertainment. In the intervening years, the building became a cinema and later was used for restaurants, before being reopened in October 2008 by Max Morey, the theater's owner and operator.

== History ==
The Crescent Theater first opened at 208 Dauphin Street in Mobile in 1885, offering vaudeville and burlesque shows. In 1912, it was converted to show silent films.

In the late 20th century, the building was used for several restaurants, and by 2006, it was operating as Derry's Ole Tyme Cafe. It suffered damage that year when a neighboring bar, Monsoon's, caught fire.

The building was later rented to Max Morey, who reopened as the Crescent Theater on October 31, 2008. Morey had first visited the city in 1992 and, according to the Press-Register, "vowed that he was going to save his money and build a movie theater there."

Following its 2008 reopening, the theater primarily screened independent and arthouse films. The theater was credited with revitalizing downtown Mobile. In 2012, it nearly shuttered when costs mounted for a switch to digital projection, but a Kickstarter raised over $84,000 to keep the theater operating. In 2017, it again faced closure when its rent rose, but met its $72,000 goal to stay open. The theater was financially supported by the Crescent Theater Film Society, a nonprofit group.

The theater was ranked the "coolest movie theater" in Alabama by Cosmopolitan.

After financial struggles, the theater closed in April 2023. In September 2025, the venue reopened under new operators Zeke Buckhaults and Stu Schayot, who announced plans to focus on comedy, cinema, and live arts.
