= John L. Rapier =

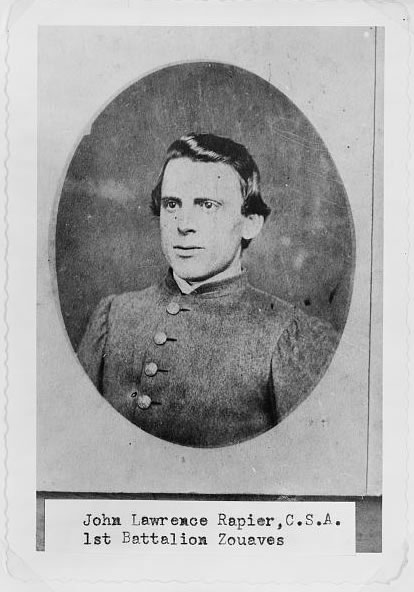
- John L. Rapier while in the 1st Battalion Zouaves
- Born: June 15, 1842; Spring Hill, Alabama
- Died: May 7, 1905 (aged 62); Mobile, Alabama
- Military career
- Allegiance: Confederate States of America
- Branch: Confederate States Army; Confederate States Marine Corps
- Rank: First Lieutenant (CSA); Second Lieutenant (CSMC)
- Unit: 1st Battalion Zouaves
- Conflicts: American Civil War: Battle of Williamsburg; Seven Days Battles; Battle of Glendale; Second Battle of Bull Run; Battle of Antietam; Battle of Fredericksburg; Battle of Mobile Bay
- Other work: Owned the Mobile Press-Register

John Lawrence Rapier (June 15, 1842 – May 7, 1905) was an American Civil War soldier and businessman. A native of Mobile, Alabama, he saw action as a sergeant major in the Seven Days Battles, and later became a second lieutenant in the Confederate States Marine Corps. He was captured at Fort Gaines, Mobile Bay, Alabama, August 5, 1864, and paroled at Nanna Hubba Bluff, Alabama, May 10, 1865.

After the war, he became the owner of the Mobile Register, and served as postmaster of Mobile.

== Family and early life ==
Rapier was born in Spring Hill, a suburb of Mobile, Alabama, the son of Thomas Gwynn Rapier and Evalina Senac. His maternal uncle was Confederate Paymaster Felix senac. He was also related to Angela S. Mallory, wife of Secretary of the Confederate Navy, Stephen R. Mallory. In 1857 he worked as a clerk in New Orleans until the outbreak of the American Civil War.

== Confederate States service ==
Rapier was enlisted from Louisiana as a private in Captain Henri St. Paul's Company (Second Company) of the Louisiana Foot Rifles on April 22, 1861. This was later folded into Company A, 7th Battalion, Louisiana Infantry. Their first assignment was Pensacola, Florida, where they arrived on April 28 and stayed until mid-September. They were then transferred to Richmond, Virginia, where they encamped for several months in the vicinity of Centerville. The battalion was then assigned to Brigadier General Richard H. Anderson's Brigade on the Virginia Peninsula in May 1862.

Rapier was promoted to Sergeant-Major of the battalion, in which capacity he fought in the Battle of Williamsburg and in the Seven Days battles. During the Battle of Frayser's Farm, June 30, 1862, part of the Seven Day's campaign, he was blinded temporarily by a shell exploding inches from his face. In August, his battalion was divided and his company became Company E of the Confederate States Zouave Battalion, Louisiana Volunteers. On August 12, this organization became part of Starke's Brigade of Taliaferro's Division. Rapier continued to serve as sergeant major. He then saw action at the Second Battle of Bull Run, Battle of Antietam and Fredericksburg, before his battalion was transferred to southeastern Virginia. In January, he was promoted to first lieutenant and adjutant of his battalion. In March, it is reported that Secretary Mallory offered him a commission in the Confederate Marine Corps, but Rapier did not initially accept it. However, several weeks later he took the examination, passed and was commissioned as a second lieutenant, dated July 11, 1863.

On August 1, he was ordered to report to Secretary Mallory, where he was then assigned to the Marine Camp at Drewry's Bluff, James River, Virginia, as part of Company A. He served there briefly until he was ordered on December 22, 1863, to report to Admiral Franklin Buchanan, commander of the Mobile Squadron. On arrival on December 28, he was assigned to the Mobile Marine Barracks. On August 3, 1864, Rapier and several fellow marines were ordered to reinforce Fort Gaines on Dauphin Island, Mobile Bay, Alabama, during which time he was made Major W. R. Browne's adjutant. Thus he participated in the Battle of Mobile Bay. When the commanding officer of the fort, Colonel Charles D. Anderson, held a council with his officers on August 6, he revealed a document he wished them to sign, surrendering the fort. Rapier and one other marine, were some of the very few that refused to sign. Rapier was captured on August 8, 1864. He later escaped from prison in New Orleans on October 13, 1864, by making his way through the swamps and bayous until he reached Mobile on November 10. He met up with Captain Fry, a relative, who gave him command of two 32-pounder guns on the gunboat Morgan. He participated in the Battle of Spanish Fort and the Battle of Fort Blakely in April 1865. He was on this boat until he surrendered on May 4, 1865. He was paroled May 10, 1865, at Nanna Hubba Bluff, Alabama.

== After the war ==
After the war, he married the daughter of a former commander, Regina St. Paul, in 1866, and after her death, he married Regina Demouy.

In 1866, Rapier took a position at the Mobile Times with his father-in-law Major St. Paul. The Times was later consolidated into the Mobile Register. He later became part owner, with Colonel John Forsyth, and upon the death of the latter, became the sole owner in 1877.

In December 1894, President Grover Cleveland appointed him Postmaster of Mobile, which position he held until March 1897. He was a member of the Catholic Knights of America, and for many years a member of the Striker's Independent Society and the Mobile Mardi Gras Society Order of Myths.

Rapier died on May 7, 1905, in Mobile, and was buried in the Catholic Cemetery.

== See ==
- In the Hope of Rising Again, ISBN 1-59448-103-2 is loosely based on Rapier. In the novel, he is "Col. Riant"
