= James Williams (ambassador) =

American diplomat

- 1861 portrait

United States Minister Resident to the Ottoman Empire
- In office May 27, 1858 – May 25, 1861
- President: James Buchanan; Abraham Lincoln
- Preceded by: Carroll Spence
- Succeeded by: Edward Joy Morris

Personal details
- Born: July 1, 1796 Grainger County, Tennessee, U.S.
- Died: April 10, 1869 (aged 72) Graz, Austria
- Spouse: Lucy Jane Williams (née Graham)
- Parents: Etheldred Williams (father); Mary Williams (née Copeland) (mother)

Opening pages of Williams' 1863 "The Rise and Fall of the Model Republic"

James Williams (July 1, 1796 – April 10, 1869) was an American Minister Resident (Ambassador) to the Ottoman Empire, appointed on January 14, 1858, by President James Buchanan. James Williams remained in this function until the outbreak of the American Civil War, terminating his functions on May 25, 1861. A native of Tennessee, he remained in Europe supporting the Confederacy by selling Confederate bonds, as well as writing numerous articles and books in favor of the South alongside Henry Hotze in London. Accused of treason for joining the Confederate cause as a US Government employee, he remained in Europe and died in Austria in 1869.

== Early life ==
James Williams was born in Grainger County, Tennessee, in 1796. He later moved to Chattanooga with his brother William Williams where both brothers owned and ran a profitable steamboat business, transporting salt and furs on the Tennessee River from Knoxville to Decatur. The two brothers began their business with only two boats, later purchasing all the boats on the river and thus ruining their competition. In the 1840s, James Williams entered the newspaper business by founding and editing the Knoxville Post. This weekly Whig newspaper was published by New Jersey native Samuel P. Ivins with Williams acting as the newspaper's editor. Williams retired from the Knoxville Post in 1844, leaving Ivins in full charge of its continuation. Ivins ran the Knoxville Post for another four years before moving it to Athens, Tennessee, and renaming it The Athens Post. Athen's current newspaper, the Daily Post-Athenian, is a direct descendant of the newspaper created by Williams and Ivins.

In 1853, the Williams brothers joined forces with William D. Fulton in establishing Chattanooga's first bank, the Bank of Chattanooga located on the corner of Market and Third streets. William Williams and William D. Fulton would both serve as mayors of Chattanooga, with Williams elected in 1854 and Fulton in 1857. The Bank of Chattanooga would operate until 1863, at which date the Union Army’s occupation of Chattanooga ended the bank's activities.

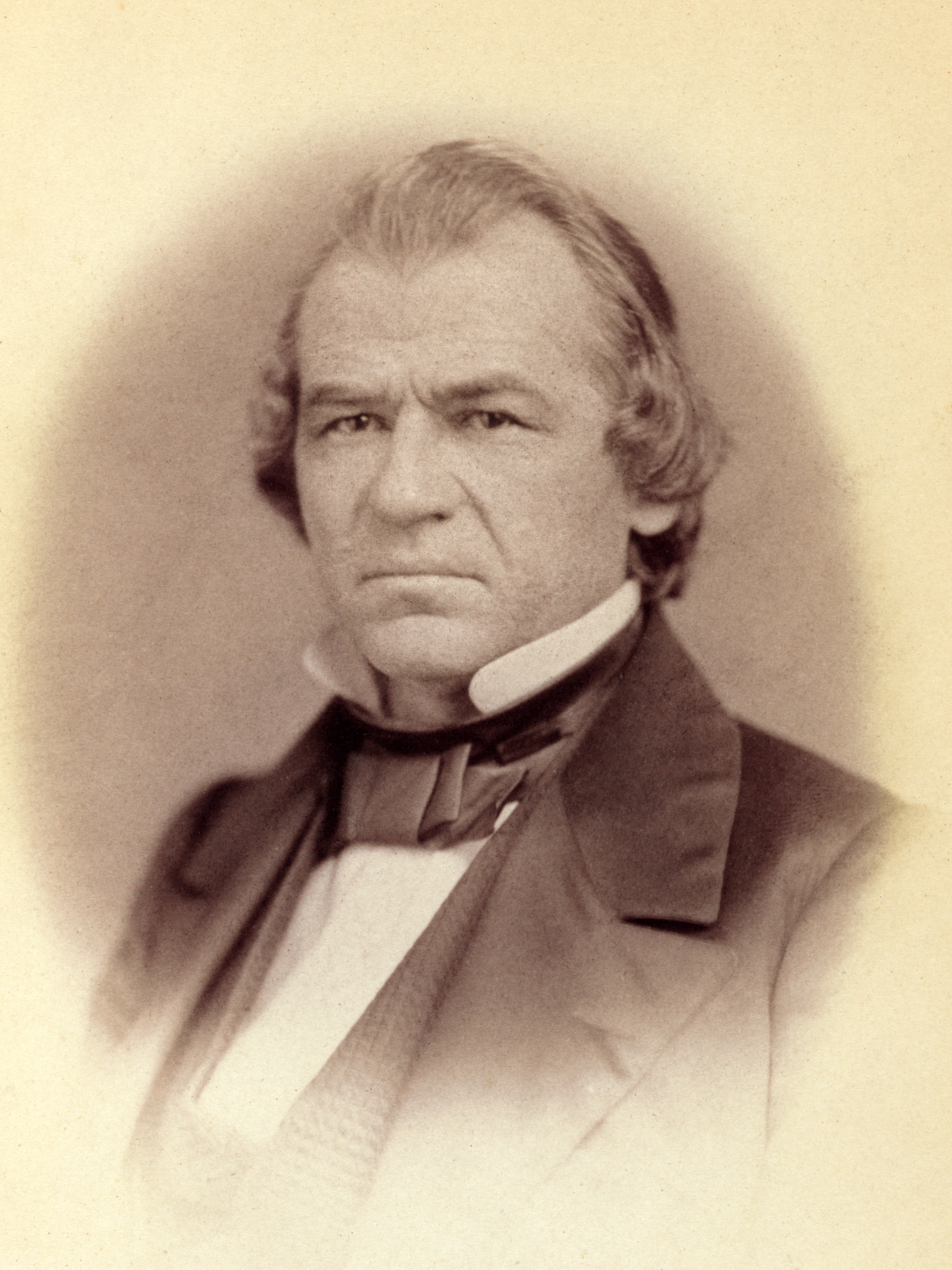
Tennessee Governor Andrew Johnson was instrumental in advancing Williams' diplomatic career.

James Williams officially left the Whig Party in 1852 and joined the Democratic Party. He would write a series of articles for Nashville's Union and American newspaper under the pseudonym "Old Line Whig". His efforts were well rewarded when the Governor of Tennessee, Andrew Johnson, later 17th President of the United States, recommended him to US President James Buchanan for a diplomatic position abroad. Johnson wrote to Buchanan on April 8, 1857, describing Williams as "a gentleman of unimpeachable character - of fine address and Literary attainments - of varied information and strong native talent. He is a man of great energy - fine business qualification, and in fine would represent this government abroad with efficiency and signal ability, sustaining his government with appropriate dignity and honor".

Receiving no favorable reply, Andrew Johnson insisted to Lewis Cass, US Secretary of State, on May 17, 1857, that "I have not been troublesome, nor do I intend to be so, in writing letters or pressing the claims of applicants for Office, but ask your consideration of this case upon personal and political grounds".

The request would be granted less than a year later.

== US Minister to the Ottoman Empire ==
The Buchanan Administration, upon the recommendation of Tennessee's governor Andrew Johnson, appointed Williams as Minister Resident (Ambassador) to the Ottoman Empire on January 14, 1858. Williams presented his credentials in Constantinople on May 27, 1858. Prior to 1893, the United States appointed ministers to head legations rather than ambassadors to head embassies. An ambassador was considered the exclusive representative of a reigning monarch abroad whereas a republic (like the United States) sent ministers and established legations. James Williams remained in this function until the outbreak of the American Civil War, terminating his functions on May 25, 1861.

A few months after having first arrived in Constantinople, Williams wrote to Secretary of State Lewis Cass on 17 November 1858 requesting a reform of the jurisdiction of the US Legation in the Ottoman Empire regarding both civil and criminal cases. In the same letter, Williams states that Constantinople is "the most expensive city as a residence in the civilized world" and that a US diplomat "will rue (regret) the day he left the shores of his native land on such a mission".

In Constantinople, James Williams was president of the Bible Society of Constantinople which met in the chapel of the Dutch Legation.

James Williams, President of the Bible Society of Constantinople

According to the "Memoirs of the Graham Family", the Williams at this time made a voyage of the Nile into lower Egypt. Mr. and Mrs. Williams were accompanied by Lord Dufferin and his mother, Lady Dufferin, a daughter of the famous English actor, Richard Brinsley Sheridan, and sister of the Hon. Caroline Norton. They were also accompanied by a young French nobleman, who took with him a corps of photographers, whose pictures of pyramids, temples and objects of interest were bound in four volumes. One of these volumes was presented to the Empress Eugenie, another volume to the Empress of Austria, a third volume to Mrs. Williams, the young nobleman keeping the fourth for his chateau treasures. Lady Dufferin was very gifted, and among Mrs. Williams' valued possessions was a portrait of herself and two daughters, painted by Lady Dufferin, who accompanied the gift with charming verses. Another member of the party was Frederika Bremer, the Swedish novelist. Lord Bulwer and Sir Richard Jackson traveled with Mr. and Mrs. Wilhams through Turkey. More exalted still were Maxmilian and Carlotta whom they visited at Schloss Miramar, Maxmilian's beautiful palace at the head of the Adriatic. There, while the ladies gazed entranced upon Carlotta's art treasures, Maxmilian and Mr. Williams paced back and forth in that famous garden, talking of Mexico, Mr. Williams vainly endeavoring to dissuade Maxmilian from that ill-fated expedition, he offering Mr. Williams many inducements to accompany him".

Even before the start of the Civil War, James Williams vilipended British abolitionists and applauded John Brown's arrest and trial. From his legation in Constantinople, he wrote the British abolitionist Lord Brougham in February 1861, expressing his surprise that the "Philanthropists of Great Britain" shut their eyes and "ears to the wail of woe which rises up around them from the millions of the unhappy, the destitute, and depressed, of their own race and kin"; preferring to shed tears "over the reputed wrongs of a handful of Africans upon the far-off shores of a continent beyond the Atlantic".

In the 1874 edition of the "Harper's Hand-book for Travellers in Europe and the East", Williams and the US Consul in Beirut are described as having "acquired great reputation in the East for the energetic manner in which they have obtained protection to Americans and their interests".

In his 1863 book "Around the Pyramids: Being a Tour in the Holy Land", the American traveller Aaron Ward describes US Minister Williams and his family on numerous occasions. He describes how the two daughters of James Williams were much appreciated in Constantinople, with one of them embraced by one of the Ottoman sultanas in front of thousands of spectators. Aaron Ward also describes at length how he was cordially received by Minister Williams, even sailing with him and his family on a wooden boat on the Bosphorus. On the 4th of July, Williams invited one hundred men and women to a picnic above the Bosphorus, including Aaron Ward, in celebration of America's national independence day.

== Confederate Agent Abroad ==
The Index Newspaper

James Williams headed for London with his family when the Civil War began in 1861. Maintaining a secret correspondence with Jefferson Davis and other Confederate diplomats, Williams sold Confederate bonds to British families and wrote extensively in the London papers, including the Times and Standard.

One newspaper Williams contributed to in particular was The Index, the official Confederate propaganda machine of Henry Hotze. It was Hotze that had Williams' book "Letters on Slavery from the Old World" translated into German and sent to Germany for distribution.

Benjamin Moran, working in the US legation in London, recorded seeing Williams with James Murray Mason at the House of Commons in July 1863. He described both men "in distinctly unflattering terms as coarse, gross, ponderous, vulgar-looking men".

During the War, James Williams' property in Nashville was confiscated from him and turned into a hospital. His massive estate in Texas and other Southern states also disappeared, his entire fortune disappearing as a result.

According to the "Memoirs of the Graham Family", the Williams were presented at the Court of Napoleon III while in France, hoping to gain recognition for the Confederacy.

== Post-War Activities ==
Following the end of the War, Williams learned from Secretary of State Seward that he was being charged with "offences committed in violation of a public trust" for his role in aiding the Confederacy in London. On 1 August 1865 he wrote Andrew Johnson, who had succeeded Abraham Lincoln as president, to clear any "misapprehension of the facts". He stated in his letter that he had been living in Germany with his family, and had returned to London to prepare a trip to the United States. Though recognizing his role in the War, stating "I espoused the cause of the South with all my heart", Williams requested "to be allowed to return to the United States, and to remain there for a period of about three months, at the end of which time I would come back again to Europe".

Williams was pardoned on June 27, 1866, by the same Andrew Johnson that had recommended him to President Buchanan in 1857. Williams returned to the United States in 1866 and had his pardon renewed while meeting President Andrew Johnson at the White House.

True to his word, Williams returned to Europe where his family was anxiously waiting for him. His daughter Kate, born in 1840 in Tennessee, had married Baron Harry Kavanagh-Ballyane (1844–1912), an Austrian nobleman of Irish ancestry. Baron Harry Kavanagh-Ballyane's mother, Paulina Wernhardt, was the daughter of Paul Freiherr von Wernhardt (1776–1846), Austrian military governor of Transylvania.

James Williams and his wife moved in with their daughter Kate and her husband Baron Harry, living in their castle of Mali Tabor located in the area of Hum na Sutli in present-day Croatia (then part of the Austrian Empire).

James Williams died in 1869 while living in Austria with his family. His wife Lucy Jane Williams returned to Tennessee and died in Nashville.

The Williams' only son, William Williams, married Mary Baldwin of Montgomery whereas their youngest daughter Mary married the Sicilian nobleman Prince Ferdinand de Liguori de Pdesicci.

== Works ==
- Letters on Slavery from the Old World (revised as "The South Vindicated"), 1861
- The Rise and Fall of the Model Republic, 1863

== See also ==
- Diplomacy of the American Civil War
