= Edward Joy Morris =

American politician and diplomat (1815–1881)

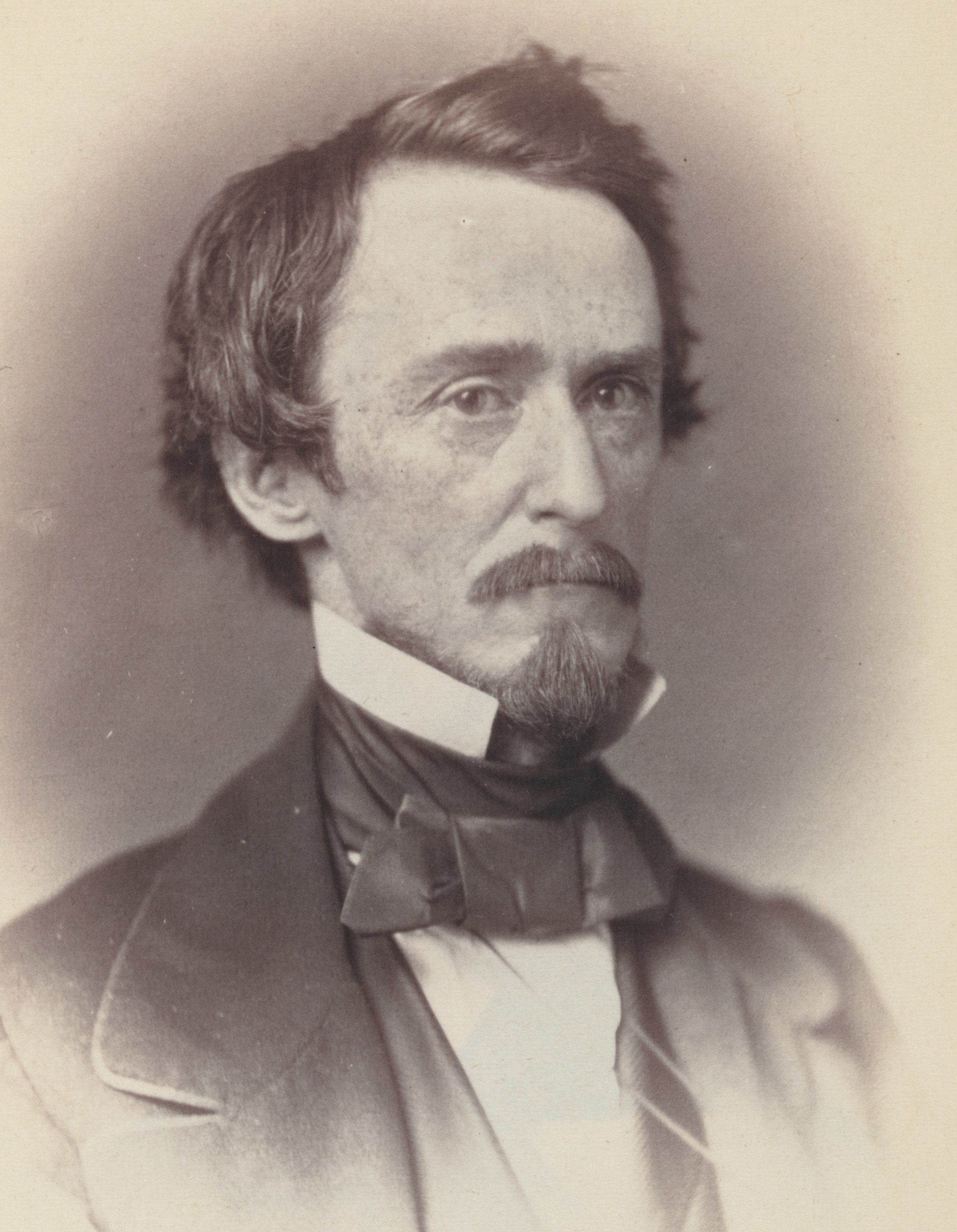

Pennsylvania House of Representatives
- In office 1841–1842

Member of the U.S. House of Representatives from Pennsylvania's 1st district
- In office March 4, 1843 – March 3, 1845
- Preceded by: Charles Brown
- Succeeded by: Lewis Charles Levin

United States Chargé d'Affaires to the Kingdom of the Two Sicilies
- In office April 4, 1850 – August 25, 1853
- President: Millard Fillmore
- Preceded by: John Rowan
- Succeeded by: Robert Dale Owen

Pennsylvania House of Representatives
- In office 1856–1856

Member of the U.S. House of Representatives from Pennsylvania's 2nd district
- In office March 4, 1857 – March 3, 1861
- Preceded by: Job Roberts Tyson
- Succeeded by: Charles John Biddle

United States Ambassador to the Ottoman Empire
- In office October 22, 1861 – October 25, 1870
- President: Abraham Lincoln
- Preceded by: James Williams
- Succeeded by: Wayne MacVeagh

Personal details
- Born: July 16, 1815 Philadelphia, Pennsylvania, U.S.
- Died: December 31, 1881 (aged 66) Philadelphia, Pennsylvania, U.S.
- Resting place: Laurel Hill Cemetery, Philadelphia, Pennsylvania, U.S.
- Party: Whig, Republican
- Education: Harvard University, University of Pennsylvania

Edward Joy Morris (July 16, 1815 – December 31, 1881) was an American politician and diplomat. He served as a Whig member of the U.S. House of Representatives for Pennsylvania's 1st congressional district from 1843 to 1845 and as a Republican member for Pennsylvania's 2nd congressional district from 1857 to 1861. He served as a member of the Pennsylvania House of Representatives from 1841 to 1842 and again in 1856. He served as United States Chargé d'affaires to the Kingdom of the Two Sicilies from 1850 to 1853 and as Minister Resident to the Ottoman Empire from 1861 to 1870.

== Early life and education ==
Morris was born on July 16, 1815, in Philadelphia, Pennsylvania. He attended the common schools and the University of Pennsylvania. He left the University of Pennsylvania in his freshman year and graduated from Harvard University in 1836. He studied law, was admitted to the bar in 1842 and practiced in Philadelphia.

== Career ==
He was a member of the Pennsylvania House of Representatives from 1841 to 1843. He was elected as a Whig to the Twenty-eighth Congress. He was an unsuccessful candidate for reelection in 1844.

He was appointed Chargé d'affaires to the Kingdom of the Two Sicilies on January 20, 1850, and served from April 4, 1850, to August 26, 1853. He was a member of the board of directors of Girard College in Philadelphia, and served a second time as a member of the Pennsylvania House of Representatives in 1856.

Morris was elected as a Republican to the Thirty-fifth, Thirty-sixth, and Thirty-seventh Congresses and served until his resignation. He was appointed Minister Resident to the Ottoman Empire by Abraham Lincoln and served from June 8, 1861, to October 25, 1870.

He wrote several books on his travels including Notes of a Tour through Turkey, Greece, Egypt, Arabia Petræa, to the Holy Land in 1842. He was fluent in French, German and Italian, and translated several books from German including Alfred De Besse's The Turkish Empire, Social and Political (1854); Theodor Mügge's Afraja, or Life and Love in Norway (1854); and Ferdinand Gregorovius' Corsica, Picturesque, Historical, and Social (1856).

He died on December 31, 1881, in Philadelphia and was interred in Laurel Hill Cemetery.

== Publications ==
- Speech of Hon. Edward Joy Morris, of Philadelphia, in Defence of the American Navy, Delivered in the House of Representatives of the United States, December 28, 1843, Washington: Jno. T. Towers, 1844
- Notes of a Tour Through Turkey, Greece, Egypt, and Arabia Petraea, to the Holy Land: Including A Visit to Athens, Sparta, Delphi, Cairo, Thebes, Mount Sinai, Petra, &c., Aberdeen: George Clark & Son, 1847
- Corsica: Picturesque, Historical and Social: with a Sketch of the Early Life of Napoleon, and an Account of the Bonaparte, Paoli, Pozzo Di Borgo, and Other Principal Families. Suggested by a Tour in the Island in 1852. Translated from the German of Ferdinand Gregorovius by Edward Joy Morris. Philadelphia: Parry and McMillan, 1855
- The Turkish Empire, Embracing the Religion, Manners, and Customs of the People. With a Memoir of the Reigning Sultan and Omer Pacha., Philadelphia: Lindsay and Blakiston, 1855
- Speech of Hon. E. Joy Morris, of Pennsylvania, on the Election of Speaker and in Defense of the North; Delivered in the House of Representatives, December 8, 1859., Washington: Congressional Globe Office, 1859
- Afraja; or Life and Love in Norway. From the German of Theodore Mügge., Philadelphia: Porter & Coates, 1860

Pennsylvania House of Representatives
Preceded by	Member of the Pennsylvania House of Representatives; 1841–1842	Succeeded by
Preceded by	Member of the Pennsylvania House of Representatives; 1856	Succeeded by
U.S. House of Representatives
Preceded by Charles Brown	Member of the U.S. House of Representatives from Pennsylvania's 1st congressional district 1843–1845	Succeeded by Lewis Charles Levin
Preceded by Job Roberts Tyson	Member of the U.S. House of Representatives from Pennsylvania's 2nd congressional district 1857–1861	Succeeded by Charles John Biddle
Diplomatic posts
Preceded by John Rowan	Chargé d'affaires to the Kingdom of the Two Sicilies; 1850–1853	Succeeded by Robert Dale Owen
Preceded by James Williams	Minister Resident to the Ottoman Empire; 1861–1870	Succeeded by Wayne MacVeagh
