= Press-Register =

Newspaper in Mobile, Alabama

- The September 26, 2006 front page of the Press-Register
- Type: Thrice weekly newspaper
- Format: Broadsheet
- Owner: Advance Publications
- Publisher: Ricky Mathews
- Editor: Mike Marshall
- Founded: 1813
- Ceased publication: February 26, 2023
- Headquarters: 401 North Water Street; Mobile, Alabama 36602
- Sister newspapers: The Huntsville Times; The Birmingham News; The Mississippi Press
- Website: www.al.com/press-register/ www.gulflive.com/mississippipress/

The Press-Register (known from 1997 to 2006 as the Mobile Register) was a newspaper serving the southwest Alabama counties of Mobile and Baldwin. The newspaper is a descendant of one founded in 1813, making the Press-Register Alabama's oldest newspaper. It is owned by Advance Publications, which also owns the primary newspapers in Birmingham, Alabama and Huntsville, Alabama. The Press-Register had a daily publication schedule since the inception of its predecessors in the early 1800s until September 30, 2012, when it and its sister papers reduced printing editions to only Wednesday, Fridays and Sundays.

The Press Register also published an edition for the Mississippi Gulf Coast, The Mississippi Press.

The Mobile Press-Register is no longer in circulation. In 2022, Alabama Media Group announced it would shut down and cease all printing in 2023. The last printed edition of the Press-Register published February 26, 2023.

== 19th century ==
The Mobile Gazette was founded and began publication shortly after Mobile was captured by United States troops in April 1813 after 33 years under Spanish rule. Another Mobile-based newspaper would begin publishing on December 10, 1821 as The Mobile Commercial Register by former Boston, Massachusetts resident and Savannah, Georgia merchant Jonathan Battelle, along with John W. Townsend of a Montgomery, Alabama newspaper. One year later, the Gazette was taken over by the Register, making it a good purchase for one Thaddeus Sanford in 1828. Under Sanford, the Mobile Patriot newspaper was bought out, thus becoming part of the daily Mobile Daily Commercial Register and Patriot in 1832. The Register is sold yet again in 1837, this time to Epapheas Kibby and Mobile attorney John Forsyth Jr., who would have a 40-year relationship with the paper until his death in 1877. The New York Times' eulogy for Forsyth included the phrase, "most important Democratic editor of the South". Mobile's yellow fever epidemic forced the Register to publish only three times a week in 1839. Once Sanford reclaimed what he purchased years before, he combined the Register with the Merchants and Planters Journal, resulting in The Mobile Register and Journal in 1841. Communication's latest innovation the telegraph became the Register's means of receiving news in 1848. After C.A. and C.M. Bradford's purchase of the Register's one-half interest, the paper was renamed The Mobile Daily Register in 1849. Forsyth once again bought back the Register in 1854. Future Confederate colonel and Kentucky poet Theodore O'Hara joined the Register shortly before the American Civil War. Swiss-born propagandist for the Confederacy Henry Hotze also worked for the paper for a time before the war.

It would take the conflict beginning in 1861 to combine the Mobile Daily Register and competitor The Mobile Daily Advertiser to form The Mobile Daily Advertiser and Register. About three years after the war, the Register was sold and combined again, this time to William d'Alton Mann of The Mobile Times and The Mobile Daily Register. Isaac Donovan's arrival as the Register's new owner in 1871 marked the beginning of a new era for the stable newspaper, including a new position for editor Charles Carter Langdon. Langdon would become the Register's agricultural editor, giving him the opportunity to promote scientific approaches in the field. In life, Langdon served as mayor of Mobile, an Alabama state legislator, and a trustee of the Alabama Agricultural and Mechanical College in Auburn. Today Langdon's contributions to what would be Auburn University are honored at the hall named for him in 1846. In 1872, the Register incorporates as The Register Printing association. During John Forsyth, Jr.'s final years, he, along with John L. Rapier formed a partnership to operate the Register. After Forsyth's death, Rapier became principal owner. Telephones would become available at the Register in 1883, along with electric light a year later. Rapier organized the stock company The Register Co. to publish the paper in 1889. Erwin S. Craighead, who would later be known as "Mobile's newspaperman" began his long career at the Register as the city editor in 1884 before earning the position of editor in chief in 1892.

Throughout Craighead's tenure until retirement in 1927, he was supportive of the former Confederacy and the Union reconciling, along with economic and commercial development. As the 19th century was coming to a close, the Register began using six Linotype typesetting machines in 1893, which were used for many decades until the "cold type" age began in 1974. Photographs began appearing in the Register during the 1890s.

== 20th century ==
In 1905, company president John L. Rapier died, allowing his son Paul to take his position at Rapier and Company, leading up to the next name change from The Daily Register to The Mobile Register. Five years later, Frederick I. Thompson became the new owner of the Register. The Mobile Item would be the next newspaper to operate under the Mississippi native, who owned a chain of newspapers in Alabama, but it would remain an afternoon paper under the name The Mobile News-Item starting in 1916. Publisher Ralph B. Chandler's afternoon newspaper The Mobile Press began publication on April 15, 1929 inside a former church on Jackson and St. Michael Street in downtown Mobile. Thompson suffered financially during The Great Depression, allowing his competitor to buy out The Mobile Register in 1932. The Mobile Daily Newspapers Incorporated was established to publish the Register as a morning paper, the Press as an afternoon paper, and both papers are combined as the weekend paper The Mobile Press Register. For the Press to continue, the Mobile News-Item had to end publication. The year 1944 had moments good and bad for the Press Register, starting with a fire stopping the presses for a brief period of time, but with help from the Army Air Corps and a New Orleans printing facility, the newspaper continued publishing. On October 1, 1944, The Mobile Press Register began publication at its new facility on 304 Government Street in downtown Mobile after years on St. Louis and Hamilton. "No effort has been spared to make it 100% efficient", as the front page article stated that day. George M. Cox was the first Press Register editor to work in the building.

From 1948 to the end of the 1950s, the Press Register owned radio station WABB. During the 1950s, the Press Register started its own photograph department under chief photographer Billy Lavender, who used the large Speed Graphic press camera. The Honolulu Advertiser received the Press Register's old press machines in 1955, as the Goss Headliner press machine began operation within the Press Register building for the next 47 years. At the time of its arrival, the Goss Headliner was commonly referred to as, "the most modern [press machine] to be found anywhere in the world". Longtime TV partner WKRG-TV went on the air in 1955. S.I. Newhouse's newspaper group bought out The Mobile Press Register in 1966. Mobile Press founder and Press Register publisher Ralph Chandler would die in 1970, giving William J. Hearin the positions of president and publisher. In December 1978, video display terminals became a fixture in the Press Register's newsroom. On September 12, 1979, Hurricane Frederic made its arrival on the Alabama Gulf Coast, stopping the Press Register from publication for two days. Baldwin County's own paper The Baldwin Press Register began publication in 1988.

In 1992, Howard Bronson, formerly of the Shreveport Times, became publisher of the Mobile Press Register with a mission for the paper to "reinvent itself as one of the most well-written, high profile news sources in the South". That same year, Stanley R. Tiner, former editor of the defunct Shreveport Journal, became the editor and vice president of news. He held that position for seven years until managing editor Michael Marshall succeeded him in 1999. One year after Bronson's arrival, sports editor Ben Nolan retired after more than 45 years in the sports department. Nolan died in 2001, as did former publisher William Hearin. Three members of the Press Register staff were named finalists for the Pulitzer Prize in 1995 after a series of editorials on reforming the Alabama Constitution. On January 31, 1997, the afternoon Mobile Press ended publication, but the name lived on in the corporate title The Mobile Press Register Inc. The name continued to appear in the weekly "Suburban", "Points South", and "Points North" sections of the Register available to certain areas of Mobile County.

== 21st century ==
After almost 58 years on Government Street, the Mobile Register moved to its current modern facility on Water Street in June 2002. Days before the big move, the Register switched to the new MAN Roland AG printing press, which is viewable from large windows stretching from top to bottom on the new building. This location within historic DeTonti Square and the City of Mobile's business district was chosen as part of an effort to revitalize the downtown area and southwest Alabama. Also that summer, the Register printed ballots for its first ever Reader's Choice Awards, where readers can choose their favorite local attractions, food, people, and much more.

In September 2004, the Register's newfound strength within its 2-year-old building was put to the test when Hurricane Ivan rolled across the Gulf Coast and into the northeast. Unlike "Frederic", the Register continued operation during and after the storm's arrival. Less than a year later, Hurricane Katrina devastated the Gulf Coast as it made landfall on August 29, 2005, along the Louisiana-Mississippi border, knocking out power and communications throughout the region. After floodwaters swept into downtown Mobile and knocked out power to the Register's building, a special Hurricane Edition of the Mobile Register was published at the Pensacola News Journal facility on August 30, 2005. Subsequent editions were published in Birmingham while utilities came back on line in the days immediately following the storm. In the devastating aftermath of Katrina's assault on New Orleans, the Times-Picayune was published at the Register facility, and transported daily to New Orleans. During this time, the Register also housed employees of the Mississippi Press, whose offices were wiped out by the storm. In the weeks and months following the hurricane, the Water Street headquarters published three daily newspapers at its facility – the Mobile Register, Times-Picayune and Mississippi Press.

On April 2, 2006, the Register restored the Press-Register name, something that has stayed with longtime residents in south Alabama over nine years after The Mobile Press ceased publication. Besides being a welcome sight for long-time readers, the return of the Press-Register name reflects the newspaper's expansion into Mobile's surrounding areas. The twice-a-week "Mobile County Neighbors" section replaces the area-specific sections that appeared every Thursday. Stock market coverage was reduced to daily summaries and a Saturday recap of the week's events, including four pages of stock and mutual fund listings.

The newspaper announced that it would shut down and cease all printing in February 2023.

== The Mississippi Press ==
The Mississippi Press was the Mississippi edition of the Press-Register, headquartered in Pascagoula. Its website is http://www.gulflive.com/mississippipress/

== Cutbacks ==
In 2012, Advance Publications announced that The Press-Register, along with its sister papers in New Orleans, Birmingham and Huntsville, would reduce their print-edition publication schedule to Wednesdays, Fridays and Sundays, with coverage on other days provided by their website, al.com. The change results in roughly half of the newspaper's staff being laid off. The change in schedule took effect on September 30, making the following day the first time since at least 1832 the Mobile had been without a daily newspaper.

After continuing losses in circulation and advertising, Advance announced that it would shut down and cease all printing in February 26, 2023.

== Notable staff ==
- Jeanne Appleton Voltz

== See also ==
- List of newspapers in Alabama
