= Stephen Mallory =

American politician (1812–1873)

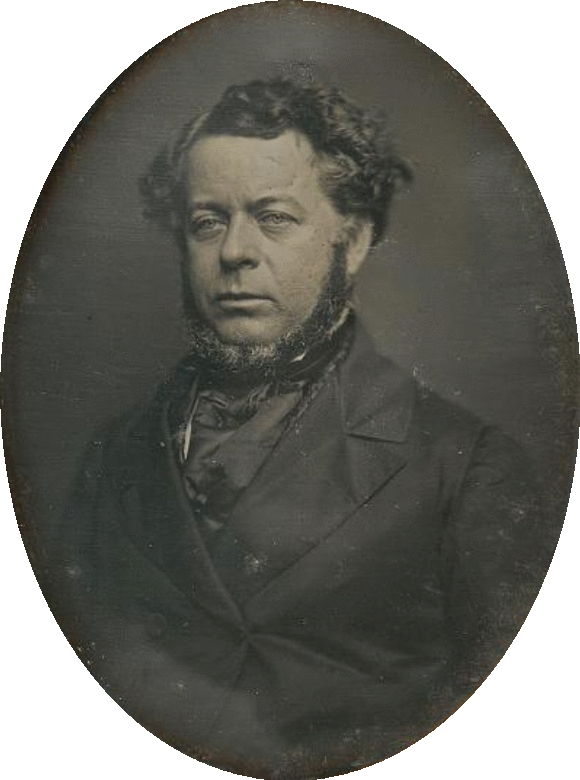

Confederate States Secretary of the Navy
- In office March 4, 1861 – May 2, 1865
- President: Jefferson Davis
- Preceded by: Position established
- Succeeded by: Position abolished

United States Senator from Florida
- In office March 4, 1851 – January 21, 1861
- Preceded by: David Yulee
- Succeeded by: Adonijah Welch

Personal details
- Born: 1812 Trinidad, British West Indies (now Trinidad and Tobago)
- Died: November 9, 1873 (aged 60–61) Pensacola, Florida
- Party: Democratic
- Spouse: Angela Sylvania Moreno

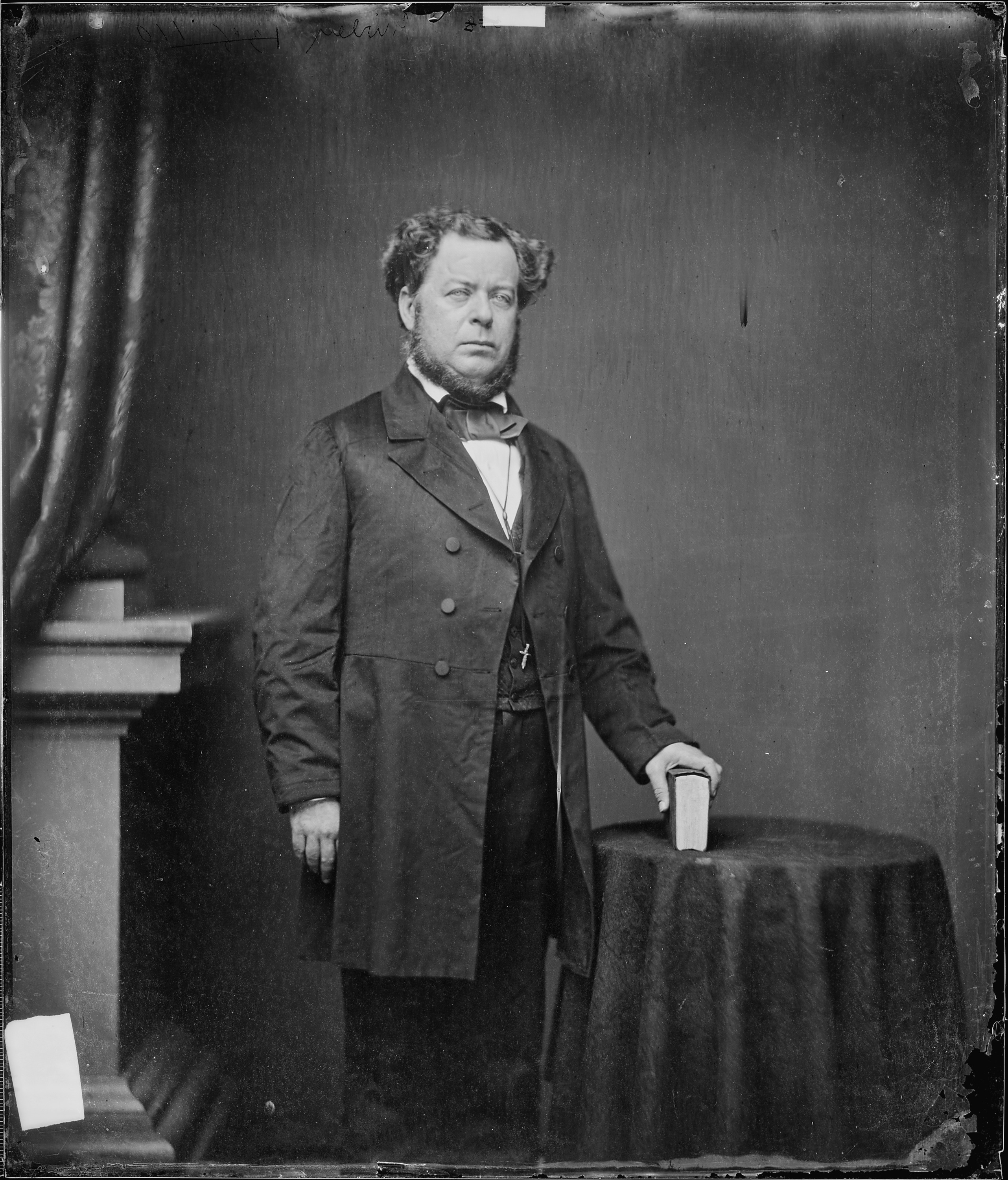
Stephen R. Mallory by Mathew Brady, between 1855 and 1865

Stephen Russell Mallory (1812 – November 9, 1873) was an American politician who was a United States senator from Florida from 1851 to the secession of his home state and the outbreak of the American Civil War in 1861. For much of that period, he was chairman of the Committee on Naval Affairs. It was a time of rapid naval reform, and he insisted that the ships of the U.S. Navy should be as capable as those of Britain and France, the foremost navies in the world at that time. He also wrote a bill and guided it through Congress to provide for compulsory retirement of officers who did not meet the standards of the profession.

Although he was not a leader in the secession movement, Mallory followed his state out of the Union. When the Confederate States of America was formed, he was named Secretary of the Navy in the administration of President Jefferson Davis. He held the position throughout the existence of the Confederacy. Because of indifference to naval matters by most others in the Confederacy, Mallory was able to shape the Confederate Navy according to the principles he had learned while serving in the U.S. Senate. Some of his ideas, such as the incorporation of armor into warship construction, were quite successful and became standard in navies around the world. On the other hand, the navy was often handicapped by administrative ineptitude in the Navy Department. During the war, he was weakened politically by a Congressional investigation into the Navy Department for its failure in defense of New Orleans. After months of taking testimony, the investigating committee concluded that it had no evidence of wrongdoing on his part.

Mallory resigned after the Confederate government had fled from Richmond at the end of the war, and he and several of his colleagues in the cabinet were imprisoned and charged with treason. After more than a year in prison, the public mood had softened, and he was granted parole by President Andrew Johnson. He returned to Florida, where he supported his family in his final years by again practicing law. Unable to hold elective office by the terms of his parole, he continued to make his opinions known by writing letters to newspapers. His health began to deteriorate although he was not incapacitated until the very end.

He was the father of Stephen Russell Mallory II, a U.S. representative and U.S. senator from Florida.

== Early life ==
Mallory was born in Trinidad, British West Indies, in 1812. His parents were Charles and Ellen Mallory. His father was a construction engineer originally from Redding, Connecticut. He met and married the Irish-born Ellen Russell in Trinidad, and there the couple had two sons.

The family moved to the United States and settled in Key West, Florida, in 1820. Young Stephen was sent to school near Mobile, Alabama, but his education was interrupted by his father's death. His elder brother John also died about this time. To support herself and her surviving son, Ellen opened a boarding house for seamen. Then she sent her son away for further schooling at a Moravian academy in Nazareth, Pennsylvania. Although he was for all of his life a practicing Catholic, he had only praise for the education he received at the academy. After about three years, his mother could no longer afford to pay his tuition, so in 1829 his schooling ended and he returned home.

== Adulthood in Florida ==
Young Mallory prepared for a profession by reading law in the office of Judge William Marvin. Because of its geographical position, Key West was often sought as a port of refuge for ships caught in storms and was for the same reason near frequent shipwrecks. Marvin was recognized as an authority on maritime law, particularly applied to laws of wreck and salvage, and Mallory argued many admiralty cases before him. He was reputed to be one of the best young trial lawyers in the state.

His career prospering, in 1838 Mallory courted and wed Angela Moreno, a member of a wealthy Spanish family living in Pensacola. Their marriage produced nine children, five of whom died young; surviving into adulthood were daughters Margaret ("Maggie") and Ruby, and sons Stephen R. Jr. ("Buddy"), and Attila ("Attie"). Buddy followed his father into politics, and he would eventually also serve as U.S. Senator from Florida. Angela Moreno was the daughter of Francisco Moreno, a wealthy businessman who established the first bank and the first hotel in Pensacola, and his first wife, Josefa López. Angela also was the cousin of Felix Senac, future Confederate Paymaster and agent in Europe, born like her in 1815 in Pensacola.

Mallory held a few minor public offices, beginning in 1832 with his selection as town marshal. One of his first paid positions was as Inspector of Customs, for which he earned three dollars per day. Later, President Polk appointed him Collector of Customs. Before his marriage, he joined the Army and took part in the Seminole War, 1835–1837. He also was elected judge for Monroe County for the years 1837–1845.

In 1850, the sectional differences that eventually culminated in the Civil War led to a convention to be held in Nashville, Tennessee, for the purpose of defining a common course of action for all Southern (slave-holding) states. Although Mallory had held no statewide offices, he was regarded as sufficiently powerful in the state Democratic Party to be chosen as an alternate delegate to the convention. Personal considerations kept him from attending, but he expressed his agreement with the purposes of the convention in a letter that was widely reprinted in the Florida newspapers.

== In the Senate, 1851–1861 ==
The term in office of senator from Florida David Levy Yulee expired in 1850. He sought reappointment, but he had aligned himself too strongly with the Fire-eaters, and also had antagonized some commercial interests in the state. The moderates who favored working within the Union still dominated Florida politics, and they successfully sought to put Mallory in place of the radical Yulee. The selection process in the Florida state legislature was somewhat irregular, and Yulee protested, carrying his protest all the way to the Senate itself. That body determined that the Florida legislature had acted within its authority in certifying Mallory, and so he was seated.

=== Senator from Florida ===
Much of what he did in the Senate can be described as the typical sponsorship of legislation that would benefit his state. With his sponsorship, the Senate passed a bill that would aid railroads in Florida, and another that would sell off some of the live oak reservations maintained by the Federal government for the Navy; both bills failed in the House of Representatives. He was more successful with bills aimed at prosecuting the ongoing campaign against the Seminole Indians, although the problem seems to have been overstated. His bills would provide compensation for persons who had suffered from the depredations of Indian raids and would further the process of removing the aborigines from the state. He also introduced bills that provided for marine hospitals in port cities in Florida. None of this would have been considered exceptional for the era.

=== Committee on Naval Affairs ===
Mallory was placed on the Senate Committee on Naval Affairs. His assignment became significant when President Millard Fillmore, in his Message to Congress of December 13, 1851, recommended Congressional action on two issues. First was the problem of what to do with ineffective officers in the Navy. At the time, promotion was based solely on seniority, and no policy existed for removing officers who could not or would not fulfill their duties. Second was the issue of discipline in the enlisted rates. The practice of flogging had been outlawed in the previous Congress, and many of the old captains believed discipline on their warships was deteriorating; they wanted a return to the old ways or at least a reasonable substitute that would enable them to exert their authority.

Mallory's first major speech in Congress was in favor of a return to flogging, which he argued was needed in order that a captain would be able to control his seamen in battle. His position was unpopular throughout the nation, and Congress refused to lift the ban. His views on flogging, for good or ill, were forgotten when he turned his energies to the second of President Fillmore's proposals, that of reforming the officer corps of the Navy. He was by this time chairman of the Senate Committee on Naval Affairs, and the law that Congress passed was recognized as coming from his hand. It established a Retirement Board of senior naval officers, who examined the qualifications of all other commissioned officers. Those who were deemed incapable or unworthy of their rank were placed on a retired list, the first compulsory retirement in the history of the U.S. Navy. By most accounts, the board did its work creditably, but many of the officers who were adversely affected did not agree. Among those who were forced into early retirement was Matthew Fontaine Maury, too crippled to go to sea, but whose study of ocean currents formed the basis for the new science of oceanography. Maury and some of the other retirees enlisted other senators to support their cases, and the debate was renewed. In the end, however, Mallory's views prevailed, a testimonial to his parliamentary skills. The enmity between Maury and Mallory lasted the remainder of their lives and distorted their performance in the Civil War when both men sided with the South.

Mallory's tenure on the Committee on Naval Affairs came during a time of great innovation in naval warfare. He kept abreast of developments in other navies, and he made sure that the U.S. Navy would incorporate the latest thinking into its new ships. Britain and France, then the two foremost navies in the world, were in the process of converting their fleets from sail to steam, and from paddles to screws. In 1853, the committee recommended passage of a bill providing for the addition of six new screw frigates to the fleet; when delivered, some considered them to be the best frigates in the world. In 1857, his committee persuaded the Senate to authorize twelve sloops-of-war. These entered the Navy beginning in 1858, on the verge of the Civil War.

Another innovation that was being considered was that of armor. Mallory was here somewhat ahead of his time, enthusiastically supporting iron cladding for ships before the fledgling metals industry in the country could supply it in the requisite quantities. No armored vessels were commissioned while he was in the Senate, but whatever fault there was lay elsewhere. He spoke up for extending appropriations for an armored vessel that was intended for the defense of New York Harbor; named the Stevens Battery after its designer and builder Robert L. Stevens, it had been laid down in 1842 but was still incomplete in 1853, when Mallory gave his argument. His pleading was unsuccessful in that the Senate did not agree to continue funding the project, but in his supporting speech he expressed some of the principles that guided his thinking when he later became the Confederate Secretary of the Navy.

=== Secession crisis ===
Representing as he did a state in the Deep South, Mallory could hardly have avoided taking a public stance on the issues that were tearing the nation apart. The occasion arose when the Senate considered the admission of Kansas to the Union. Its Lecompton Constitution would allow slavery in Kansas, and citizens who were against extending the practice into new territories seized upon the widespread irregularities in the adoption procedure to oppose it. Senator Preston King of New York mounted a two-hour attack on the constitution and Southern policy in general, following which Mallory replied in what his biographers describe as "probably his most effective speech in the Senate." One segment of his talk presented the rationale of the slave-holders in their unwillingness to accept majority rule. Addressing the question whether the constitution had been ratified by "the people," he said: "States have conferred, and may at any time confer, their whole political power on a minority. They may make disqualifications dependent upon the tenure of freehold estate, upon the payment of tax, upon militia duty, or upon the color of skin; but whoever the State chooses to confer her political authority upon, are the people." He foresaw the decline in relative power of the slave-holding states, although at this time he did not believe it would necessarily lead to secession. He concluded his remarks by a pledge to follow the South whatever happened: "It is not for me to indicate the path she [the South] may, in her wisdom, pursue; but, sir, ... my whole heart is with her, and she will find me treading it with undivided affections."

Despite his willing adherence to the Southern position on the issues that were dividing the country, Mallory was not prominent in the secession movement. He advocated reconciliation almost up to the moment that Florida passed its ordinance of secession. That occurred on January 10, 1861, making Florida the third state (behind South Carolina and Mississippi) to leave the Union. On January 21, Mallory delivered his farewell speech in the United States Senate.

In the days before Abraham Lincoln took office, parties in the seceding states disagreed over the proper course of action concerning the forts within their domains. In Florida, three forts remained in the possession of the United States Army: Fort Zachary Taylor at Key West, Fort Jefferson in the Dry Tortugas, and Fort Pickens near Pensacola. Some of the most strident secessionists proposed that they be taken over immediately, by force if needed, beginning with Fort Pickens. Cooler heads hoped to avoid bloodshed and gain possession by negotiation; they made much of the conciliatory words of William H. Seward, already selected to be Secretary of State in the incoming administration. Mallory and Florida's other senator, David L. Yulee, and the two senators from Alabama sent telegrams to their respective governors urging caution. Other Southern senators lent their support, and President-elect Jefferson Davis seemed to agree. In the end, the moderates won out, and no attack was made on Fort Pickens. Although Mallory was hardly alone, his political opponents later used his perceived pro-Union stance as an excuse to attack him.

== Confederate Secretary of the Navy: nomination and confirmation ==
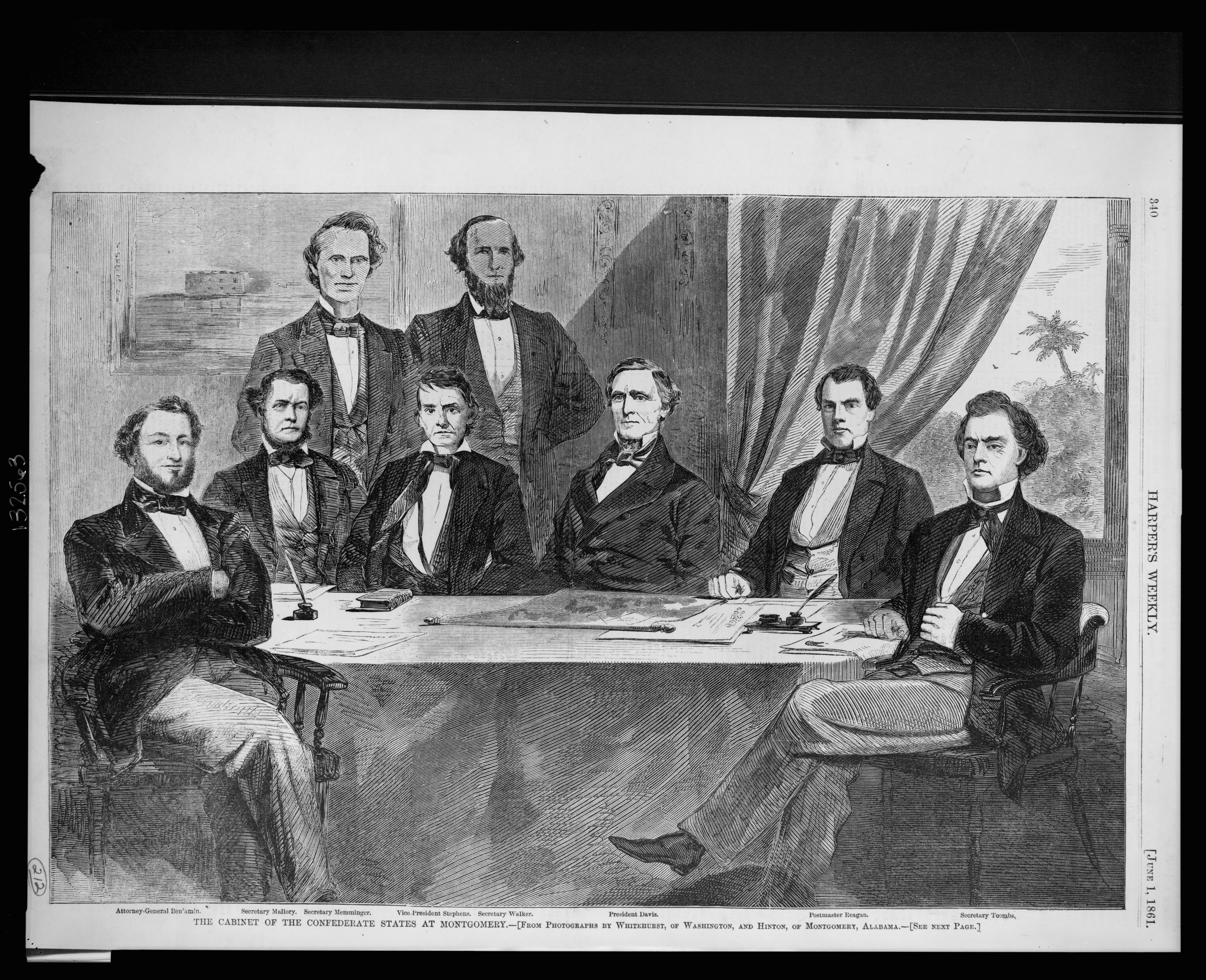
The original Confederate Cabinet. L-R: Judah P. Benjamin, Stephen Mallory, Christopher Memminger, Alexander Stephens, LeRoy Pope Walker, Jefferson Davis, John H. Reagan and Robert Toombs

The governmental structure of the newly formed Confederate States of America was very much like that of the parent United States. The executive branch was partitioned into several departments, each headed by a secretary or equivalent who would advise the president. The constitution provided for a navy that would be directed by its own department, and President Jefferson Davis nominated Mallory to be Confederate States Secretary of the Navy. He was chosen for two principal reasons: first, he had extensive experience with nautical affairs, both in his boyhood home of Key West and later in Washington; and second, he was from Florida. In a bow to the principle of states' rights, Davis had to spread representation in his cabinet around among the seceding states. Although the requirement of geographical representation sometimes meant that the occupant would not be the best person available, the selection process worked well in Mallory's case.

Mallory's nomination as Secretary of the Navy was submitted to the Provisional Congress as soon as the act establishing a navy was passed. Despite his evident qualifications, it drew significant opposition; his detractors cited the Fort Pickens incident as evidence that he was not strongly pro-secession. Ultimately, however, he was confirmed.

=== Naval organization and operations ===
As few other persons in the Confederate government were interested in naval matters, Mallory had almost free rein to shape the department, as well as the navy it controlled, according to his own views. The result was very much the product of his prior experience. The Department of the Navy was organized into separate offices, equivalent to the bureau system of the United States Navy; whereas the U.S. Navy had five bureaus, the Confederate Navy had only four: Orders and Detail (dealing with personnel), Provisions and Clothing, Medicine and Surgery, and Ordnance and Hydrography. Although there was no Office of Construction and Repair, its function was met by John L. Porter. Porter served as Chief Naval Constructor, without title from the start until the position was officially established in 1863, and thereafter with title until the end of the war. A few other functions lay outside the bureau system: a small Marine Corps, a few men who were sent to Europe to acquire vessels there and who reported directly to Mallory, and a Torpedo Bureau.

At the start, the Confederate Navy faced one of the problems that Mallory had encountered when he was chairman of the United States Senate Committee on Naval Affairs: an overabundance of high-ranking officers who were too old to go to sea. This came about because the Confederacy had created its navy by promising that men resigning from the U.S. Navy would enter the CS Navy at their old rank. Hoping to avoid the stagnation that was the result of the former promotion process, Mallory proposed that promotion should depend solely on "gallant or meritorious conduct during the war." His proposal was quickly made into law by the Confederate Congress. Still not completely satisfied, in 1863 Mallory initiated the creation of a Provisional Navy, which in effect established two officer corps. The officers whom Mallory or his advisers deemed incapable of combat were retained in the Regular Navy, while young and presumably more aggressive officers would transfer to the Provisional Navy. Officers for fighting ships would be drawn from the Provisional Navy, and they could be promoted without regard for seniority if they served with distinction.

Mallory also was able to shape naval policy and doctrine. After viewing the disparity between the shipbuilding and other manufacturing facilities of the Confederacy and those of the Union, he set forth a fourfold plan for the navy:

1. Send out commerce raiders to destroy the enemy's mercantile marine.
2. Build ironclad vessels in Southern shipyards for defensive purposes.
3. Obtain by purchase or construction abroad armored ships capable of fighting on the open seas.
4. Employ new weapons and techniques of warfare.

=== Attacks on Union commerce ===
From the start, one of the main efforts of the Confederate Navy was to counter the blockade of its ports by the Union Navy. Mallory believed that by attacking the merchant shipping that carried trade to Northern ports he could force his Union counterpart, Secretary of the Navy Gideon Welles, to divert his own small fleet to defend against the raiders. In the early days of the war, the Confederacy tried to enlist the services of private shipowners in the service by offering letters of marque and reprisal. Issuance of the letters was not in the purview of the Navy Department, but Mallory was aware of them and saw them as part of his plan. For several reasons, the privateers did not have the success that was hoped for. Although they ventured out throughout the war, they had only fleeting success, and that had ceased by the end of the first year.

He was more directly involved in the activities of the commissioned raiders, ships of the Confederate States Navy that were sent out to destroy rather than capture enemy commerce. He first proposed their use as early as April 18, 1861. The first raider, CSS Sumter, avoided the Union blockade at New Orleans on June 30, 1861. From then until after the war was over, the small group of raiders plundered Union shipping, inflicting damage on the American Merchant Marine that persists to the present day. They failed of their primary purpose, however, because Welles maintained the Union blockade, and international trade continued as before, carried in ships flying foreign flags.

=== Naval reform: ironclads ===
No other aspect of Mallory's tenure as Secretary of the Navy is better known than his advocacy of armored vessels. He argued that the Confederacy could never produce enough ships to compete with the industrial Union on a ship-by-ship basis. As he saw it, the South should build a few ships that were individually so far superior to their opponents as to dominate. In his words, "The perfection of a warship would doubtless be a combination of the greatest known ocean speed with the greatest known floating battery and power of resistance." He hoped that armored warships would prove to be the "ultimate weapon." He did not anticipate that his opponents would also produce armored vessels, which rapidly became important parts of both navies. Furthermore, other navies, notably Great Britain and France, stepped up the conversions of their own fleets from wood to iron. Certainly, the change was under way even before the Civil War broke out; his legacy consists in forcing the change to be made sooner than would otherwise have been done.

The first ironclad to be created at Mallory's urging was CSS Virginia. The burned and scuttled USS Merrimack had been raised at Gosport (Norfolk) Navy Yard, and an armored casemate built on her hull. For armament, she carried 12 guns. She was also fitted with an iron ram. On March 8, 1862, she attacked the Union fleet enforcing the blockade at Hampton Roads, on the James River near Norfolk. She sank two major Union warships (USS Cumberland and Congress), and menaced a third (Minnesota), which had grounded in the attempt to get into action. The damages she suffered were negligible. In that first day of the battle, she had demonstrated the basic validity of Mallory's belief that armored warships could destroy the best wooden ships and were almost impervious to damage in return. As is well known, when Virginia returned to battle the next day intending to finish off Minnesota, she encountered the Union's Monitor. The two armored vessels fought inconclusively, demonstrating the flaw in Mallory's argument: an ultimate weapon is truly decisive only if one side does not have it.

After Virginia, most other Confederate ironclads had at best-limited success, and many were complete failures. Particularly embarrassing were four that were contracted to be built for service on the Mississippi River. Of the four, only one, CSS Arkansas, entered into combat in the way that was intended, with full crew and under steam. Of the others, Tennessee was destroyed on the stocks; Mississippi was hastily launched and then burned to avoid capture; and Louisiana was used merely as an ineffectual floating battery at the Battle of Forts Jackson and St. Philip, when the fate of New Orleans was decided, and she was then blown up rather than be surrendered. No parties in the Confederacy acquitted themselves well in the three losses, but Mallory must bear a large part of the blame. Poor administration is among the foremost reasons for the delays that hindered completion of the vessels. By failing to prioritize their construction, he allowed Louisiana and Mississippi to compete for scarce resources. Because he did not delegate responsibility, he was swamped with details of the construction of Virginia while letting problems concerning the other ships go unresolved. And because he accepted the role implicitly assigned to his service as secondary to the Army, the Navy had to work with only the materials and funds that were left over after the Army had satisfied its needs.

=== Mission to Europe ===
The backward condition of shipyards in the seceding states convinced Mallory that he would have to look abroad to obtain the vessels that he thought would be able to challenge the U.S. Navy. He selected two men as his primary representatives: James D. Bulloch and Lieutenant James H. North of the Confederate States Navy. North was a disappointment, but Bulloch proved to be one of the most effective agents for the Confederacy in Europe. He sought diligently and discreetly in England to acquire ships for the purposes of his government while working within or around the framework of the neutrality laws of the host nation.

Four of the Confederate Navy raiders were purchased in Britain: CSS Florida, Georgia, Shenandoah, and above all, Alabama. Probably Mallory would have liked to have more, but the record shows that the few that were commissioned were more than adequate.

Efforts to purchase or have built ironclad warships were unsuccessful despite Bulloch's best efforts. Buying them was never seriously considered, as the Royal Navy would not care to give any of its best ships to a foreign power, no matter how favorably disposed. Contracts were made with private shipyards in both Britain and France to build rams to Confederate naval specifications, but their ultimate purpose could not be disguised. They therefore directly violated the neutrality laws, and American (that is, Union) officials immediately informed the governments of their existence. For a while, Her Majesty's Government chose to turn a blind eye on developments, but the Union victories at Gettysburg and Vicksburg caused them to reconsider. On September 5, 1863, Ambassador Charles Francis Adams sent a message to Foreign Minister Lord John Russell informing him that the first of the ironclads was about to leave, and that "it would be superfluous in me to point out to your Lordship that this means war." The ship was not permitted to leave and was later seized for the Royal Navy. As the French government had implicitly agreed to follow Britain's lead concerning North America, all the contracts were voided.

=== New weapons ===
The Civil War provided a testing ground for numerous innovations in warfare, and Mallory was in position to provide support for many of them. His advocacy of armored vessels has been described and is the development most closely associated with his name, but he encouraged the development of several other weapons. For example, he favored the use of rifled guns, as opposed to the smoothbore muzzle loaders used in the Union Navy. The favored gun was a rifle designed by the head of his Office of Ordnance and Hydrography, Lieutenant John Mercer Brooke. The Brooke rifle gave Rebel gunners a qualitative advantage over their Yankee counterparts that persisted to the end of the war.

The torpedo office, officially named the Submarine Battery Service, developed underwater explosive devices, known as "torpedoes" at that time but as "mines" today. The office was initially led by Mallory's enemy Matthew Fontaine Maury, and later by Lieutenant Hunter Davidson. The first ship to be lost to mines was USS Cairo, on December 12, 1862. Subsequently, more vessels of all types were lost in combat to mines and torpedoes than from all other causes combined.

In Charleston Harbor, Army Captain Francis D. Lee, supported by General P. G. T. Beauregard, developed a small boat that would carry a spar torpedo. His craft, known as David, successfully exploded a torpedo against the side of USS New Ironsides, severely damaging her. Later, the more famous H. L. Hunley used one of Lee's spar torpedoes to sink USS Housatonic, the first ship to be sunk by a submarine. The Navy Department had not provided active support for Lee's experiments, but their successful result led to the use of spar torpedoes on ships throughout the fleet. (Less favorably for the Rebel cause, spar torpedoes were also immediately adopted by the Union Navy, and one was used in October 1864 to sink the ironclad CSS Albemarle.)

== Investigation of the Navy Department ==
The loss of New Orleans came as a tremendous shock to the Confederacy, and a spate of recriminations followed. Members of Congress, noting the failure of the ironclads, blamed the navy in particular, and suggested that there was no need for a separate Navy Department. Hoping to forestall such a proposal, Mallory was able to persuade the Congress instead to investigate the conduct of the department. Each house put five of its members on the investigating committee. The chairman, Senator Clement C. Clay, was known as one of Mallory's friends, as was Representative Ethelbert Barksdale. They were at least partially balanced by Representative Henry S. Foote, a persistent critic of secession and everything that the entire Davis administration had done. Also weighing in against Mallory was Senator Charles M. Conrad, chairman of the Naval Affairs Committee, who was not a member of the investigating committee but who did appear as a prosecution witness. The committee continued to meet for more than six months, and ended with no finding of neglect or malfeasance.

The investigation may have weakened Mallory politically and certainly diverted him from other duties, but it was not enough to drive him from office. Perhaps because there was no one to replace him and perhaps because he absorbed shafts that were aimed at the president, Davis retained him in the cabinet until the end of the war. After the surrender of Lee's army at Appomattox, Mallory remained with Davis and the other cabinet members as they fled deeper into the South, first to Danville, Virginia, then to Greensboro, North Carolina, Charlotte, Abbeville, South Carolina, and finally Washington, Georgia. There, Mallory submitted his resignation and went to La Grange, Georgia, where he was temporarily reunited with his wife and children.

== After the war ==
=== Capture and imprisonment ===
A large part of the population of the Northern states believed that the Davis government was somehow involved in the assassination of Abraham Lincoln, and, although there was no evidence of their complicity, it was a political reality with which public officials had to deal. One result was that the political radicals were able to force the government to prosecute those who had led the war against the Union. Mallory was one of the Confederate leaders who were charged with treason, among other things; on May 20, 1865, while he was still at La Grange, he was roused from his sleep at about midnight and taken into custody. From there, he was taken to Fort Lafayette in New York Harbor, where he was confined as a political prisoner.

For several months, the demand of the public for vengeance increased, so that Mallory feared that he would face the death penalty if convicted. However, no bill of particulars to specify precisely which of his acts constituted treason was ever presented, and it became increasingly clear that no one in the Confederate government was guilty of assassinating the former president. The period for extracting vengeance passed with no one put on trial, and hope was revived. From his prison cell, Mallory began to write letters in a personal campaign to gain release. He petitioned President Andrew Johnson directly and enlisted the support of some of his former colleagues in the Senate. His wife, Angela, visited Washington and importuned President Johnson and other persons who had influence. Johnson was already quite lenient in granting pardons, and the popular clamor for harsh punishment began to recede by the end of the year. On March 10, 1866, Johnson granted Mallory a "partial parole". Although he was no longer in jail, he was required to stay with his daughter in Bridgeport, Connecticut until he could take the oath of allegiance.

=== Release and return to Florida ===
In June 1866, Mallory visited Washington, where he called on many of his old friends and political adversaries, including President Johnson and Secretary of War Edwin M. Stanton, who received him cordially. He got permission to return to Florida; his return was somewhat delayed by problems with his health, but on July 19 he arrived at his home in Pensacola.

By the terms of his parole, Mallory was not permitted to hold public office, so he made a living by reopening his old law practice. Nominally excluded from politics, he managed to make his views known by writing letters and editorials for Florida newspapers. At first, he urged acceptance of the reconstituted Union and acquiescence in the policies of Reconstruction, but he soon came out in opposition, particularly against black suffrage.

He had long suffered occasional attacks of gout, and these continued to plague him in the postwar years. In the winter of 1871–1872, he began to complain of his heart, and his health began to deteriorate. Still, he remained active, and the end came rather quickly. He is said to have been "listless" on November 8, 1873, and that night he began to fail. On the morning of November 9, he died. He was buried in St. Michael's Cemetery, Pensacola, Florida.

== See also ==
- List of United States senators born outside the United States

== Notes ==
U.S. Senate
Preceded by David Yulee	United States Senator (Class 1) from Florida; 1851–1861; Served alongside: Jackson Morton, David Yulee	Succeeded by Adonijah Welch^{(1)}
Political offices
New office	Confederate States Secretary of the Navy; 1861–1865	Position abolished
Notes and references
1. Because of Florida's secession, the Senate seat was vacant for seven years before Welch succeeded Mallory.
