= CSS Mississippi =

Confederate Navy ironclad warship

History

Confederate States
- Name: Mississippi
- Namesake: Mississippi (state)
- Builder: Nelson and Asa F. Tift
- Laid down: 14 October 1861
- Launched: 24 April 1862
- Fate: Burned to avoid capture, 25 April 1862

General characteristics
- Displacement: 1400 tons
- Length: 250 ft (76 m)
- Beam: 58 ft (18 m)
- Draft: 15 ft (4.6 m)
- Propulsion: steam, 3 screws
- Speed: 8 knots (15 km/h; 9.2 mph)
- Complement: 380 crewmen
- Armament: 12 x 9 in (229 mm) Dahlgren guns; 4 x 7 in (178 mm) Brooke rifles; 4 x 6.4 in (163 mm) Brooke rifles
- Armor: 4.5 inches (110 millimeters) iron

CSS Mississippi was a projected ironclad warship of the Confederate States Navy, intended to be used on the Mississippi River in the vicinity of New Orleans during the American Civil War. Her design was unusual, as she was built according to house-building techniques. Whether this would have proved to be feasible cannot be known, as she was not complete when New Orleans fell to the Union Fleet under Flag Officer David G. Farragut on 25 April 1862. Rather than let her fall into enemy hands, Captain Arthur Sinclair, CSN, ordered her to be hastily launched and burned. Despite the delays in construction that left her unfinished and untried, her mere existence, together with that of CSS Louisiana, raised thwarted hopes in the defenders of New Orleans, and unfounded fears in Union circles, that affected the strategy of both sides in the campaign on the lower Mississippi. Mississippi is significant to the Civil War therefore not so much as a warship as in the way her reputation influenced events, and as an example of the difficulties the South had in the contest with the industrial North.

== Origin of the river ironclads ==
At the start of the Civil War, Confederate Secretary of the Navy Stephen R. Mallory had promptly urged the building of armored warships, to counter by the inherent quality of ships in his Navy the superior numbers the Federal Navy would be able to use. At his prodding, the Confederacy embarked on a construction program that included several armored vessels intended for use on the Mississippi River and other inland waters. The initial plans, prepared after US President Abraham Lincoln had proclaimed the blockade of Southern ports but before the North had taken any major steps to subjugate the South, called for five ironclads to be built in the interior: CSS Eastport on the Tennessee River, Arkansas and Tennessee on the Mississippi at Memphis, and Louisiana and Mississippi at New Orleans. In the end, only Arkansas of these five ever engaged the Union fleet in the intended manner; here we are concerned with why Mississippi was unable to do so.

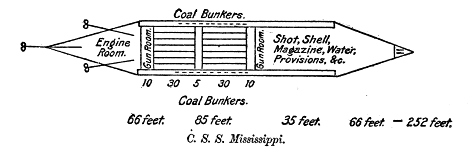
Deck plan of CSS Mississippi sketch prepared by N. Tift.

== Concept, contract, and construction ==
Nelson Tift had been raised in Florida but moved to Georgia as a young man and there became locally prominent. (The town of Tifton, in Tift County, is named for him.) At the outbreak of the Civil War, he realized some of the difficulties faced by the South in its need to confront the Northern navy. Secretary Mallory had called for building a navy essentially from scratch, but not only were there no shipyards, there were also no skilled shipwrights to work in them. Reasoning that too much time would be lost training men in traditional techniques, Tift hit on the idea of constructing ships on housebuilding principles. He thought of making a ship with flat sides, with square corners except where the pointed ends join with the rest of the hull. He made a model to illustrate his idea and used it to further his proposal. (See accompanying figure.)

Nelson's brother Asa F. Tift agreed to work with him. Asa's support was important, as he had remained in Florida when Nelson moved to Georgia. He had become a successful businessman in Key West, where he had come to know Stephen Mallory before he had become a United States senator and then Confederate Secretary of the Navy. No evidence exists that Asa Tift and Mallory were ever formally associated in any of their businesses, but their friendship opened doors. The Tifts showed the model to Mallory, who in turn showed it to a naval review board. When the board pronounced the idea to be feasible, Mallory authorized the brothers to go to New Orleans and there put their idea into concrete form. They were to supervise the construction of an as yet unnamed armored ship carrying 18 guns, driven by three screws.

The contract, such as it was, was unusual. The Tifts were not paid for their labors, aside from expenses. They were encouraged to alter the planned construction if they thought that doing so would improve it. No completion date and no cost limit were set. All depended upon the skill and integrity of the Tifts. In the words of Secretary Mallory,

The Department trusts to your patriotism, judgment, and discretion to produce the ship designed in the shortest time at the lowest price and to act in the premises generally as if you were building for yourselves and had to pay the money out of your own pockets.

Among the first tasks confronting the brothers was that of finding a shipyard capable of handling a job as big as the one envisioned. None in or near New Orleans was suitable, so they established their own at Jefferson City, on the river just north of the city line. As the builders of CSS Louisiana had the same experience and solved it the same way, the two monsters came to be built side by side. Mississippi's name was henceforth forever linked with that of Louisiana.

The first plank —it would be incorrect to refer to it as the keel— was laid down on 14 October 1861. Already it had been found that the engines of the original design could not drive the finished vessel at the desired speed, so more boiler space had to be added. This increased the overall length to 252 feet (77 meters). The extra length allowed positions for two more guns, for a total of twenty. For comparison, CSS Virginia (ex-USS Merrimack) carried only 12 guns, while Louisiana had 16.

From the first, construction was delayed by a combination of circumstances. Acquisition of parts and materials was most obvious, but the builders also encountered labor troubles, plus interference from the local military authorities. Consider these in turn.

Iron for the armor was in short supply throughout the Confederacy and was not to be found near New Orleans. Eventually the Tifts were able to find a foundry in Atlanta that would produce plate iron of sufficient thickness, but delivery by way of the already overtaxed railroad system was often sporadic. Plates awaiting shipment sometimes lay in Atlanta for weeks. The final armor arrived in New Orleans on the day the ship was burned.

The engines and shafts added to the problems. The increased size of boilers, already alluded to, caused some delay. The contract that was let for the engines called for the job to be done by the end of January, but they were not installed until April. The greatest mechanical problem, however, was fabrication of the three shafts that were to connect the engines to the screws. The two outboard shafts could be handled by New Orleans shops, but the long central shaft could not be manufactured anyplace in the Confederacy. A satisfactory shaft was found in a wrecked ship in October, but only the Tredegar Iron Works or the Gosport (Norfolk) Navy Yard in Virginia could handle the needed modifications. When they were completed, the shaft then had to be transported over the rails. It was shipped out on 26 March. Although all three shafts were put into the hull, they were not hooked up with the engines, and the two outboard screws were still on the wharf at the end.

Labor troubles of the traditional sort arose in November, shortly after work commenced. The workers in all the shipyards struck, demanding that their wages be increased from $3 to $4 per day. The other owners wanted to wait out the strikers, but after a week the Tifts gave in. The others were forced to follow suit. Trouble of a different sort was found shortly thereafter, when the Tifts found that they were competing with E. C. Murray, who was building Louisiana, for the same skilled workmen. To solve this problem, the Tifts and Murray agreed to share labor, with Louisiana having first call.

Another set of delays was caused by the local military policies, which insisted that all men of appropriate ages participate in militia activities, including parades. A protest to the governor was rejected. Murray and the Tifts requested of Major General Mansfield Lovell that their men be exempted. Although Lovell agreed and issued the needed order, the practice continued.

Although all the delays cannot be simply added to find how much time was lost, clearly the loss was critical. Long after Mississippi was torched and New Orleans was surrendered, Nelson Tift stated that he believed his ship would have been completed in another two or three weeks. (This estimate was contradicted by Captain Sinclair, who thought she was more like ten weeks away from completion.)

== The final days ==
In mid-March 1862, the Union fleet under Flag Officer Farragut began to enter the Mississippi from the Gulf of Mexico, with the obvious ultimate purpose of attacking New Orleans. Farragut was already under some time pressure from Secretary of the Navy Gideon Welles, who feared that if the two ironclad "monsters" (a term widely used at the time to characterize CSS Louisiana and Mississippi) were to be successfully completed, they would be able to shatter the blockade.

The Confederate government in Richmond was not so much concerned with the blockade as with the threat posed by the Union Western Gunboat Flotilla, then approaching Memphis. Even as Farragut was moving his ships across the bar, President Davis and Navy Secretary Mallory were promising Flag Officer George N. Hollins, commanding the Confederate States Navy forces on the Mississippi, that Louisiana would be sent up to Memphis as soon as she could be finished (expected to be within days), and Mississippi would follow shortly thereafter. At about this time, the Navy Department ordered Commander Arthur Sinclair to report to New Orleans to take command of Mississippi. Sinclair arrived on 3 April.

The Tift brothers about this time came under increasing public pressure to hasten the completion of their ship. A self-appointed group of citizens, calling themselves the Committee of Public Safety, tried to force them to launch Mississippi prematurely, against the advice of Sinclair and the engineers working on the ship. The Tifts refused, arguing that to do so would delay completion by several weeks.

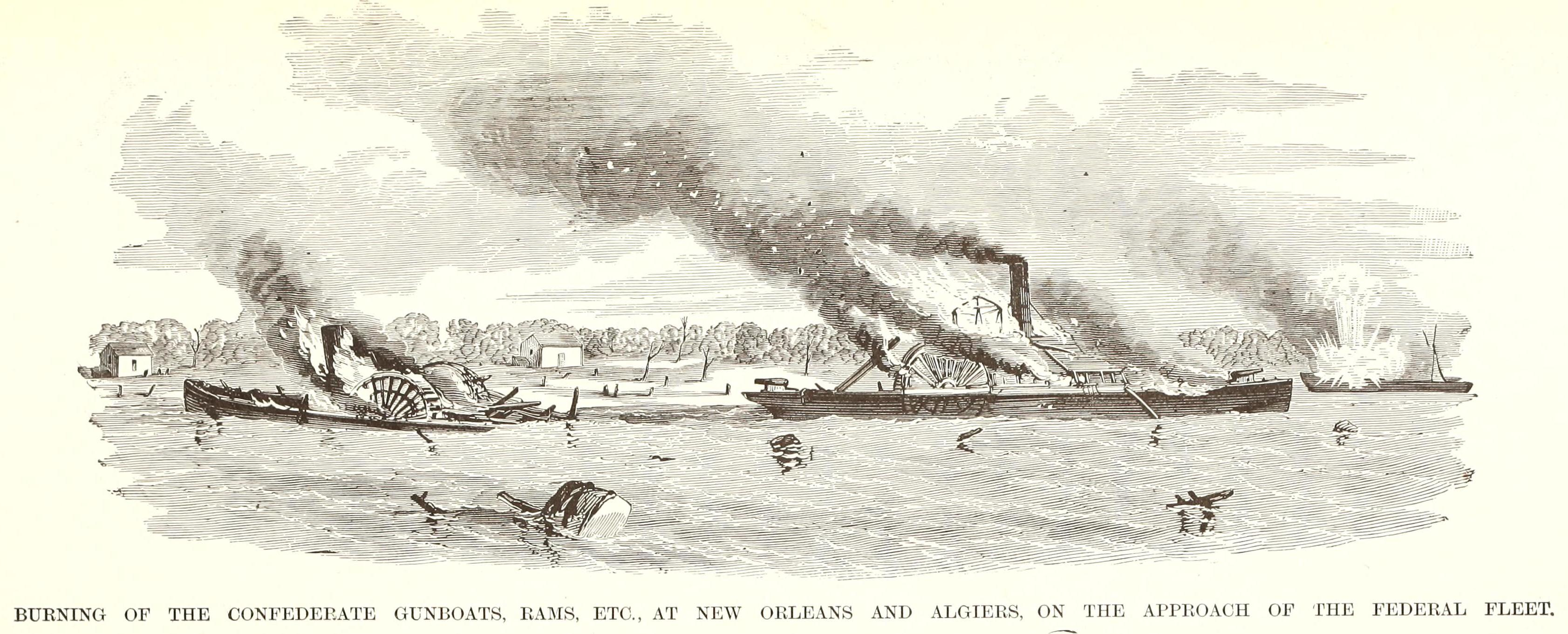
Burning of the Confederate gunboats, rams etc. at New Orleans and Algiers on the approach of the Federal Fleet

All arguments were rendered moot on 24 April, when the Union fleet passed the forts defending New Orleans from the south. Trying to move the ship to a safe place where she could be finished, Sinclair had her hastily launched — with approval of the Tifts — and tried to have her towed upriver. The tow boats he initially hired were inadequate, however, so next day he tried to find others. While he was so engaged, the Union fleet came in sight, so Mississippi was ordered burned.
