= CSS Louisiana =

Coordinates: 29°21′48″N 89°27′41″W

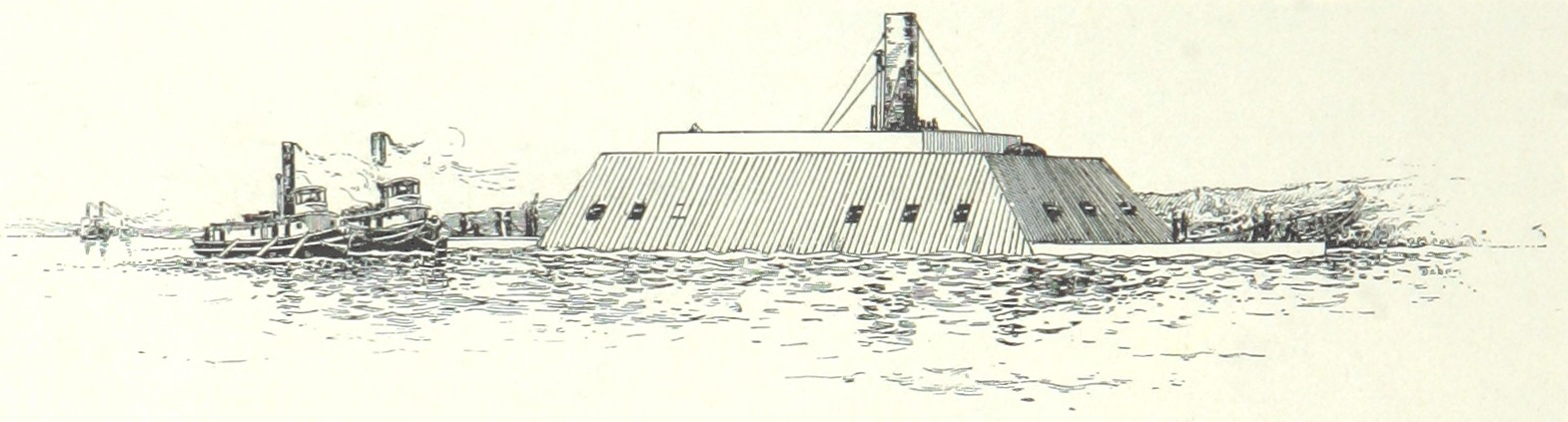
- CSS Louisiana on the way to Fort St. Philip

History

Confederate States
- Name: Louisiana
- Namesake: State of Louisiana
- Ordered: October 1861
- Laid down: c. 15 October 1861
- Launched: 6 February 1862
- Commissioned: 20 April 1862
- Fate: Set afire by her crew to avoid capture; drifted down Mississippi River, exploded near Fort St. Philip on 28 April 1862

General characteristics
- Displacement: 1,400 tons
- Length: 264 ft (80 m)
- Beam: 62 ft (19 m)
- Draft: 12 - 13 feet (3.66 - 3.96 m)
- Complement: 300 crewmen
- Armament: 2 × 7 in. (178 mm) Brooke rifles, 4 × 8 in. (203 mm) Dahlgren smoothbore guns, 3 × 9in.(228mm)guns. Seven 32-pounder guns

CSS Louisiana was a casemate ironclad of the Confederate States Navy built to aid in defending the lower Mississippi River from invasion by the Union Navy during the American Civil War. She took part in one major action of the war, the Battle of Forts Jackson and St. Philip, and when that ended disastrously for the Confederacy, she was destroyed by her crew.

== Construction ==
Louisiana was laid down in mid-October 1861 by E.C. Murray in a new shipyard just north of New Orleans. The ship had two paddlewheels and two screws, each driven by its own engine. The paddlewheels were mounted one abaft the other in a center well. The screws were not intended for propulsion, but were to aid the two rudders in steering in the confined waters and unpredictable currents of the Mississippi. The engines were taken from steamer Ingomar, but two months were needed for their transfer. The casemate extended her full length, less 25 feet at each end. It was covered by T-rail iron in two courses, while its top was encompassed by sheet iron bulwarks nearly four feet high.

Construction was delayed by several circumstances. First was the lack of materials, particularly iron. Always in short supply in the Confederacy, its procurement was made even more difficult by the blockade and by Army demands on the overstrained railroads of the South. The blockade also negated efforts to bring in needed light oak from Florida, forcing the builders to find alternative sources. Labor troubles led to a strike that lost about a week. Even more time was lost to demands of the local militia, which called out the workers for drills, including parades. Competition for skilled workmen with the builders of CSS Mississippi, an ironclad being built in an adjacent shipyard by Nelson and Asa Tift, also slowed down construction, until Murray and the Tifts agreed to let Louisiana have first call on the labor force; Mississippi would go forward only when work on Louisiana was halted for some other reason. She was not ready to launch until 6 February 1862, nearly four months after the keel was laid.

== In battle ==
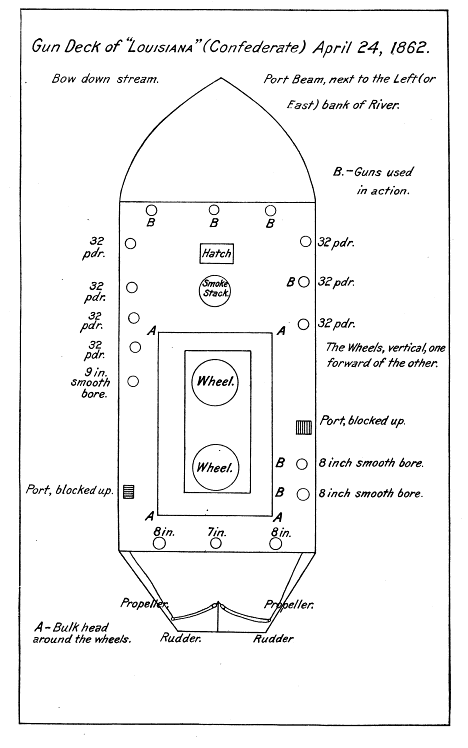
Deck plan drawing of CSS Louisiana

Shortly after Louisiana was launched, the Federal West Gulf Blockading Squadron, under Flag Officer (later Admiral) David Farragut had moved into the lower Mississippi River, threatening the Confederate-held Forts Jackson and St. Philip, about 120 kilometers or 75 miles below New Orleans. A portion of the squadron, a division of mortar boats led by Commander (later Admiral) David Dixon Porter, had on 16 April 1862 taken position downstream, and on 18 April they began their bombardment. Brigadier General Johnson K. Duncan, commanding the forts, and his immediate superior officer, Major General Mansfield Lovell, importuned Commander William C. Whittle, in charge of Confederate naval forces in the vicinity, to bring the ship down to the forts, even though she was not yet complete, and for that reason was still in the hands of her builders. Whittle yielded to their pleas, and on 20 April commissioned the vessel in the CS Navy, with Commander Charles F. McIntosh commanding.

At this time, the main engines of Louisiana had been installed, but those for the screws, needed for steering, had not. Furthermore, the main engines were found to be inadequate; even at dangerously high boiler pressure, she could barely make headway against the river current. Unable to move on her own, she had to be towed down to the forts, with workmen still aboard. There she was tied to the left bank (near, the north side of the river) a short distance above Fort St. Philip. This did not completely mollify General Duncan, who wanted the ship to be positioned below the forts, but Commander Whittle would not risk his vessel, with its unarmored deck, against the plunging fire of the Union mortars. She remained at this position throughout the ensuing battle.

In assessing the battle-readiness of the ship, the engines are not alone in deserving attention. Many of her gun carriages were found to be either too high or too low, and had to be modified. Because the workmen and their tools occupied much of the gun deck, the gun crews were unable to practice. In addition, the crew was incomplete, as a result of the hasty commissioning; to handle the guns, soldiers had to be transferred from the forts.

After nearly a week of mortar bombardment, Farragut concluded that it was ineffective, so he moved his fleet past the forts on the night of 24 April. Because of her position on the river bank, Louisiana could use neither her stern guns nor those on her port side. The magnitude of her contribution to the ensuing firefight between the forts and the Federal fleet is not known; General Duncan stated that she may have fired as few as 12 shots. On the other hand, testimony from her enemies indicates that she exchanged shots with at least one attacking ship, USS Brooklyn (misidentified as USS Hartford in the Confederate reports). Three shots from Louisiana went all the way through the Federal vessel, while the return broadside bounced harmlessly off the Rebel's armor. Indeed, the armor was effective; only three men were killed on Louisiana, all of them in exposed positions. One of them was her captain, Commander McIntosh.

== Destruction ==
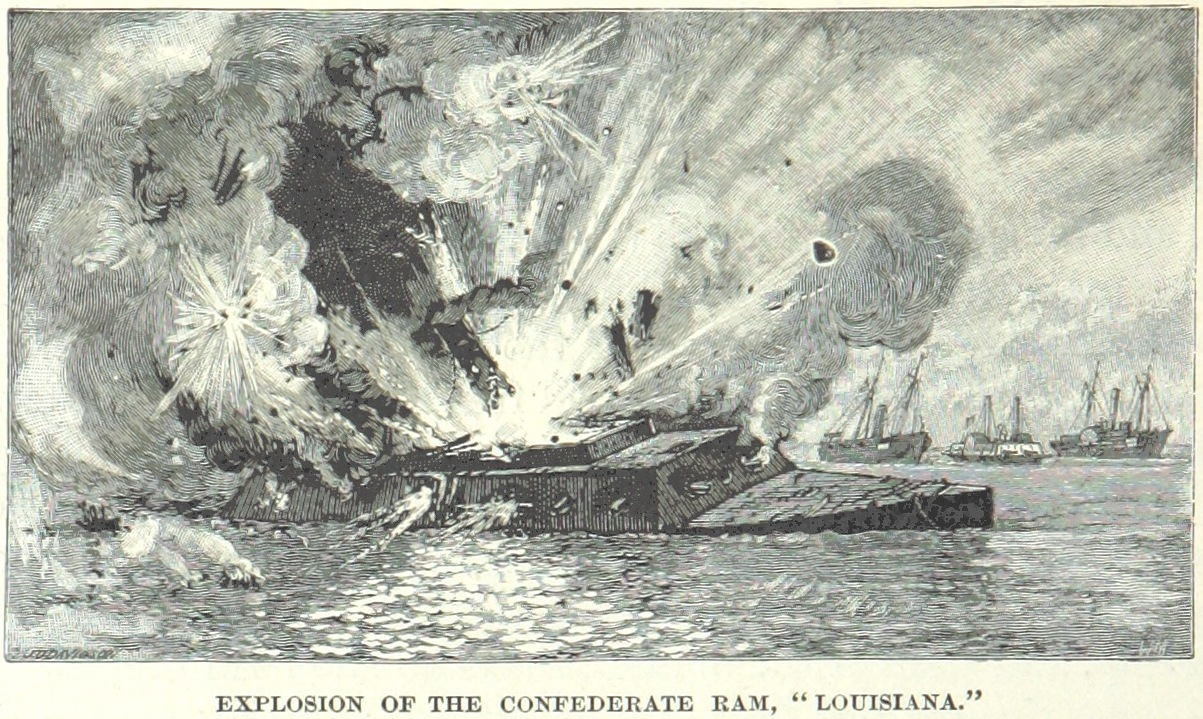
The Louisiana explodes

Once the Federal fleet had passed out of range, Louisiana had no further part in the action. Her fate was henceforth tied to that of the forts, which prepared for an expected attack by the Union army accompanying the fleet, led by Major General Benjamin Butler. However, on the night of 28 April, the enlisted men in Fort Jackson mutinied and forced the surrender of both forts to Commander Porter. The naval officers on Louisiana were not consulted at any time during the negotiations between Porter and General Duncan, so they considered themselves not bound to respect the truce declared by the two sides. While discussions of terms were going on, they decided not to let their ship fall into enemy hands. Louisiana was set afire, and her crew went ashore. The flames soon parted the lines that held her to the bank, and she drifted down the river. When she was nearly abreast of Fort St. Philip, the fire reached her magazine, and she blew up with a blast that killed a soldier there.

== Assessment ==
Perhaps to counter charges that the Confederate Navy was responsible, by its inaction, for the failure of the forts to turn back Farragut's fleet, Commander John K. Mitchell, second in command under Commodore Whittle, pointed out several shortcomings of Louisiana, any one of which would have seriously compromised her fighting ability.

1. The arrangement of the paddlewheels meant that the after wheel was always in the wash of the other, with the result that its power was wasted.
2. The wash also created an eddy at the rudders, making it impossible to steer.
3. The gun ports were too small to allow either elevation or traverse. Consequently, she would have to fight at close range, and furthermore her guns covered only 40 degrees of azimuth.
4. The gun deck was uninhabitable in summer, particularly when the boilers were in use.

== Today ==
The wreckage of the Louisiana lays at the bottom of the Mississippi River. In November 1981, it was magnetically located by NUMA. The official website of the search is here.

== See also ==
- Bibliography of American Civil War naval history

== Notes ==
Abbreviations used in these notes:

- ORN I (Official records, navies, series I): Official records of the Union and Confederate Navies in the War of the Rebellion.
