= John Forsyth Jr. =

American diplomat

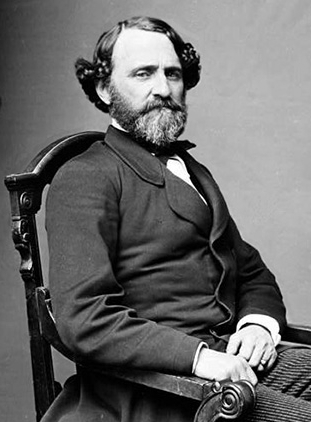
- Born: October 31, 1812; Augusta, Georgia, U.S.
- Died: May 2, 1877 (aged 64); Mobile, Alabama, U.S.
- Resting place: Magnolia Cemetery
- Education: Princeton University
- Occupations: Editor, diplomat, politician
- Political party: Democratic
- Spouse: Margaret Hull (m. 1834)
- Father: John Forsyth

John Forsyth Jr. (October 31, 1812 – May 2, 1877) was an American newspaper editor of the Mobile Register and the son of politician John Forsyth.

== Biography ==
Born in Augusta, Georgia, he attended the University of Georgia at Athens where he was a member of the Phi Kappa Literary Society. Forsyth graduated from Princeton in 1832. In 1834, Forsyth married Margaret Hull, the daughter of Latham Hull of Augusta, GA. Their son Charles, born in Mobile, Alabama, would go on to serve as a colonel in the Confederate Army.

Forsyth was for many years one of the foremost Democratic Party editors of the south. He was Adjutant of the First Georgia Regiment in the Mexican War. In 1856 he was appointed Minister to Mexico, but in 1858 demanded his passports and withdrew from the legation. He went on to become the Mayor of Mobile, Alabama in 1860. By 1863, he served as Chief of Staff in the Confederate Army of Tennessee.

On July 17, 1857, he attempted to negotiate a US purchase of Mexican territory including the whole of Baja California, as well as parts of Northern Sonora and Chihuahua up to the Yaqui River at the Gulf of California coast, then to the Bavispe River, and then to the 30th parallel north.

In 1861, with Martin J. Crawford of Georgia, he represented the Confederate States as commissioner to the National government, but his request for an unofficial interview with William Henry Seward was declined. He left for Mobile, Alabama after the Civil War and engaged in journalistic work until health problems compelled him to retire. He died in Mobile on May 2, 1877. The Mobile Register of May 5, 1877 (its columns draped in black) printed a lengthy obituary: "a large congregation of Mobile citizens were assembled to testify by their presence, their love and respect for the honored dead." A funeral cortege traveled to Magnolia Cemetery where the final interment took place.

Diplomatic posts
Preceded by Richard S. Spofford	U.S. Minister to Mexico; 1856-1858	Succeeded by William M. Churchwell
