= Sarah Rogers =

Sarah or Sara Rogers may refer to:

- Sarah B. Rogers (active circa 2020s), American lawyer and government official
- Sara Bulkley Rogers (1864–1907), American novelist and short story writer
- Sarah Rogers Haight (1808–1881), née Rogers, American traveler and writer
- Sarah Rogers (Marvel Comics), fictional character, mother of Steve Rogers
