= Samuel George Morton =

American physician, naturalist, and writer (1799–1851)

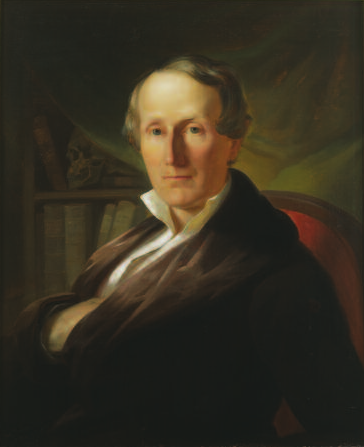
- Born: January 26, 1799; Philadelphia, Pennsylvania, U.S.
- Died: May 15, 1851 (aged 52); Philadelphia, Pennsylvania, U.S.
- Resting place: Laurel Hill Cemetery, Philadelphia, Pennsylvania, U.S.
- Education: University of Pennsylvania; University of Edinburgh
- Occupations: Physician, natural scientist, writer
- Children: 8 including James St. Clair Morton

Signature
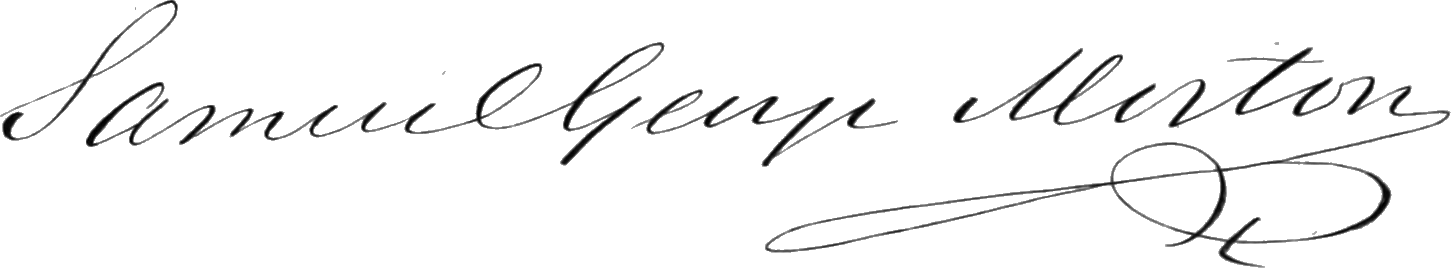

Samuel George Morton (January 26, 1799 – May 15, 1851) was an American medical doctor, naturalist, and writer. As one of the early figures of what is now known as scientific racism, he argued against monogenism, the single creation story of the Bible, instead supporting polygenism, a theory of multiple racial creations.

He was a prolific writer of books on various subjects from 1823 to 1851. He wrote Geological Observations in 1828, and both Synopsis of the Organic Remains of the Cretaceous Group of the United States and Illustrations of Pulmonary Consumption in 1834. His first medical essay, on the use of cornine in intermittent fever was published in the Philadelphia Journal of the Medical and Physical Sciences in 1825. His bibliography includes Hybridity in Animals and Plants (1847), Additional Observation on Hybridity (1851), and An Illustrated System of Human Anatomy (1849).

== Early life and career ==
Born in Philadelphia, Pennsylvania, he was the son of George Morton, an Irish immigrant from Clonmel, County Tipperary. Morton was raised as a Quaker and educated at Westtown School and the University of Pennsylvania, from where he graduated in 1820. He then earned an advanced degree from the University of Edinburgh, in Scotland, and began to practice medicine in Philadelphia in 1824. He was one of the founders of the Pennsylvania Medical College in Philadelphia and served as its professor of anatomy from 1839 until his resignation in 1843. He was elected a member of the American Philosophical Society in 1828 and the American Antiquarian Society in 1844. He is buried at Laurel Hill Cemetery, Philadelphia.

== "American School" ethnology ==
Samuel George Morton is often thought of as the originator of "American School" ethnology, a school of thought in antebellum American science that claimed the difference between humans was one of species rather than variety and is seen by some as the origin of scientific racism. Morton claimed the Bible supported polygenism, and working in a biblical framework, his theory stated that each race had been created separately and each was given specific, irrevocable characteristics. Although Morton would sometimes later be called a white supremacist, the anthropologist John S. Michael argues Morton was not one in the current sense of the word as he viewed only a select few white groups as racially superior and excluded other white Europeans.

After inspecting three mummies from ancient Egyptian catacombs, Morton concluded that white and black people were distinct three thousand years ago. Since the Bible indicated that Noah's Ark had washed up on Mount Ararat, Morton claimed that Noah's sons could not possibly account for every race on earth. According to Morton's theory of polygenesis, races have been separate since the start, Morton argued that the bible provided only a general account of creation and that the Garden of Eden birthed only the "Adamic" race.

Morton claimed that he could define the intellectual ability of a race by the skull capacity. A large volume meant a large brain and high intellectual capacity, and a small skull indicated a small brain and decreased intellectual capacity. He was reputed to hold the largest collection of skulls, on which he based his research. He claimed that each race had a separate origin, and that a descending order of intelligence could be discerned that placed Caucasians at the pinnacle and black people at the lowest point, with various other race groups in between. His research of ancient Egyptians was meant to show that this racial hierarchy had always existed and should remain in place. When confronted with evidence that many ancient Egyptians had dark skin like other Africans, Morton used skull measurements to corroborate the words of Georges Curvier: "whatever may have been the hue of their skin, they belonged to the same race with ourselves." Aside from this occasionally dark-skinned Caucasian ruling class, Morton's skull measurements led him to admit "Negroes were numerous in Egypt but their social position in ancient times was the same that it now is, that of servants and slaves." Morton's scholarship greatly contributed to Egyptology and several other disciplines adopting the Hamitic Hypothesis, the idea that civilization is antithetical to black people and that any evidence of civilization in Africa must have derived from Caucasian presence or influence. Morton's skull collection was held at the Academy of Natural Sciences of Philadelphia until 1966, when it was transferred to the Penn Museum, where it is presently curated.

Morton's theories were very popular in his day, and he was a highly respected physician and scientist. The anthropologist Aleš Hrdlička called Morton "the father of American physical anthropology". Crispin Bates has noted that Morton's "systematic justification" for the separation of races, along with the work of Louis Agassiz, was also used by those who favoured slavery in the United States, with the Charleston Medical Journal noting at his death that "We of the South should consider him as our benefactor for aiding most materially in giving to the negro his true position as an inferior race."

=== Craniology ===
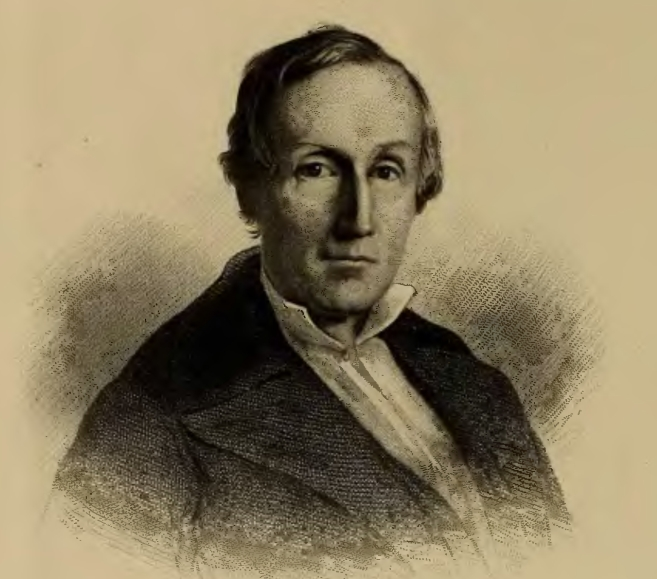
Engraving of Morton from the frontispiece to Types of Mankind by Nott and Gliddon

Morton claimed in his Crania Americana that the Caucasians had the biggest brains, averaging 87 cubic inches (1,426 cc), Indians were in the middle with an average of 80 cubic inches (1,344 cc) and Africans had the smallest brains with an average of 78 cubic inches (1,278 cc). Morton believed that the skulls of each race were so different that a wise creator from the beginning had created each race and positioned them in separate homelands to dwell in.

Morton believed that cranial capacity determined intellectual ability, and he used his craniometric evidence in conjunction with his analysis of anthropological literature then available to argue in favor of a racial hierarchy which put Caucasians on the top rung and Africans on the bottom. His skull measurements (by volume) then came to serve as "evidence" for racial stereotypes. Unlike other scientists of the age, Morton argued that Native Americans were not mongoloid and instead were a unique race with a distinct skull shape. He described the Caucasian as "distinguished by the facility with which it attains the highest intellectual endowments"; Native Americans were described as "averse to cultivation, and slow in acquiring knowledge; restless, revengeful, and fond of war, and wholly destitute of maritime adventure" and the Africans he described as "joyous, flexible, and indolent; while the many nations which compose this race present a singular diversity of intellectual character, of which the far extreme is the lowest grade of humanity".

Morton's followers, particularly Josiah C. Nott and George Gliddon in their monumental tribute to Morton's work, Types of Mankind (1854), carried Morton's ideas further and backed up his findings which supported the notion of polygenism – the premise that the different races were separately created by God. The publication of Charles Darwin's On the Origin of Species in 1859 changed the nature of the scholarly debate. Morton's work also had notable critics, while Alexander von Humboldt initially viewed Crania Americana as ethnographically valuable he later rejected it due to it's claims of racial supremacy which he saw as contrary to Abolitionism, he also rejected the notion that Native Americans were distinct from mongoloids. In 1847 Charles Darwin criticized Morton for both his theories and over reliance on Cuvier.

Morton amassed over 1,000 human skulls from across the globe; skulls were looted from historical conflict sites, such as the Battle of San Jacinto (1836) and the Seminole Wars in Florida, as well as those excavated from Indigenous burial mounds throughout the Americas. Additionally he acquired the skulls of executed criminals, remains from the Potter's field specifically the Philadelphia Almshouse (Blockley) and skulls of ancient Egyptians primarily through George Robins Gliddon, the former U.S. vice-consul at Cairo. Some of the skulls that Morton collected and measured include those of enslaved people, including a shipment of 55 human crania from Cuba, procured by Rodriguez Cisneros, these belonged to enslaved Africans who had died on the farm, "Vedado". Morton amassed his collection of human skulls when he worked at the Academy of Natural Sciences. The collection was transferred to the University of Pennsylvania Museum of Archaeology and Anthropology in 1966. In 2021, the University of Pennsylvania Museum apologized for the unethical collection and promised to repatriate the remains of the people whose skulls were collected by Morton. The museum has promised to provide burials for 13 skulls of Black Philadelphians. In January 2024, 19 skulls from the Morton collection were interred in two mausolea in Eden Cemetery in Collingdale, Pennsylvania.

== Allegations of bias in data collection and interpretation ==
In a 1978 paper and later in The Mismeasure of Man (1981), Stephen Jay Gould asserted that Morton had, perhaps because of an unconscious bias, selectively reported data, manipulated sample compositions, made analytical errors, and mismeasured skulls in order to support his prejudicial views on intelligence differences between different populations. Gould's book became widely read and Morton came to be considered one of the most prominent cases of the effects of unconscious bias in data collection, and as one of the main figures in the early history of scientific racism.

Subsequently, two separate studies of Morton's data and methods, one conducted in 1988 and the other in 2011, argued that Gould had overstated or misrepresented the case, and that Morton's measurements were essentially correct. In the latter study, entitled "The Mismeasure of Science: Stephen Jay Gould versus Samuel George Morton on Skulls and Bias" and authored by six anthropologists, it was concluded that the bias came from Gould, who failed to examine and remeasure the crania in order to determine Morton's level of accuracy. However, this study was reviewed in an editorial in Nature, which recommended a degree of caution, stating "the critique leaves the majority of Gould's work unscathed," and noted that "because they couldn't measure all the skulls, they do not know whether the average cranial capacities that Morton reported represent his sample accurately." The journal stated that Gould's opposition to racism may have biased his interpretation of Morton's data, but also noted that "Lewis and his colleagues have their own motivations. Several in the group have an association with the University of Pennsylvania, to whom Morton donated his collection of skulls, and have an interest in seeing the valuable but understudied skull collection freed from the stigma of bias and did not accept Gould's theory "that the scientific method is inevitably tainted by bias."

A 2014 review of the paper by University of Pennsylvania philosophy professor Michael Weisberg, tended to support Gould's original accusations, concluding that "there is prima facie evidence of a racial bias in Morton's measurements". Weisberg concludes that although Gould did commit mistakes in his own treatment, Morton's work "remains a cautionary example of racial bias in the science of human differences".

Research based on the discovery of some of Morton's original data by University of Pennsylvania anthropology doctoral student Paul Wolff Mitchell in 2018 argues that Morton was nevertheless guilty of bias, though not in data collection. Mitchell argues that Morton's interpretation of his data was arbitrary and tendentious; he investigated averages and ignored variations in skull size so large that there was significant overlap. A contemporary of Morton, Friedrich Tiedemann, had collected almost identical skull data and drawn conclusions opposite to Morton's on the basis of this overlap, arguing strongly against any conception of a racial hierarchy.

== Evolving views on race of the Egyptians ==
Samuel George Morton believed that the Nile Valley in both Egypt and Sudan was originally populated by a branch of the Caucasian race. Furthermore, he considered the Copts as being a mixed community. Morton wrote that Egyptian Fellahs are the lineal and least mixed descendants of the ancient Egyptians, he originally believed the modern Nubians are a mixed race of Arabs and black people, and are not descendants of the monumental Ethiopians.

Samuel Morton later addressed several letters to George Gliddon, and stated that he modified many of his old views on ancient Egypt, believing them to be similar to Barabra (northern Nubian) populations, but not black.

On 26 February 1846 he wrote:

"I am more than ever confirmed in my old sentiment, that Northern Africa was peopled by an indigenous and aboriginal people, who were dispossessed by Asiatic tribes. These aborigines could not have been Negroes, because the latter were never adapted to the climate, and are nowhere now, nor ever have been, inhabitants of these latitudes. Were they Berabra? - or some better race, more nearly allied to the Arabian race?"

In another letter to Gliddon, December 14, 1849:

"By the hands of the person to whom you confided them, I last night received Lepsius's "Chronologie," and the tin case of fac-simile drawings. These, when studied in connection with the Egyptian heads [skulls], and especially with the small series sent me [from Memphis] by your brother William [seventeen in number, and very ancient,], compel me to recant so much of my published opinions as respects the origin of the Egyptians. They never came from Asia, but are the indigenous or aboriginal inhabitants of the valley of the Nile. I have taken this position in my letter to Mr. J.R. Bartlett (New York Ethnological Soc. Journal, I.): every day has verified it, and your drawings settle it forever in my mind. It has cost me a mental struggle to acknowledge this conviction, but I can withhold it no longer."

In another letter to Gliddon, January 30, 1850:

"You allude to my altered views in Ethnology; but it all consists in regarding the Egyptian race as the indigenous people of the valley of the Nile. Not Asiatics in any sense of the word, but autochthones of the country, and the authors of their own civilization. This view, which you will recollect is that of Champollion, Heeren, and others [excepting only that they do not apply the word indigenous to the Egyptians], in nowise conflicts with their Caucasian position; for the Caucasian group had many primordial centres, of which the Egyptians represent one."

In a letter to Mr. Bartlett on Dec. 1, 1846, he wrote:

"My later investigations have confirmed me in the opinion, that the valley of the Nile was inhabited by an indigenous race, before the invasion of the Hamitic and other Asiatic nations; and that this primeval people, who occupied the whole of Northern Africa, bore much the same relation to the Berber or Berabra tribes of Nubia, that the Saracens of the middle ages bore to their wandering and untutored, yet cognate brethren, the Bedouins of the desert."

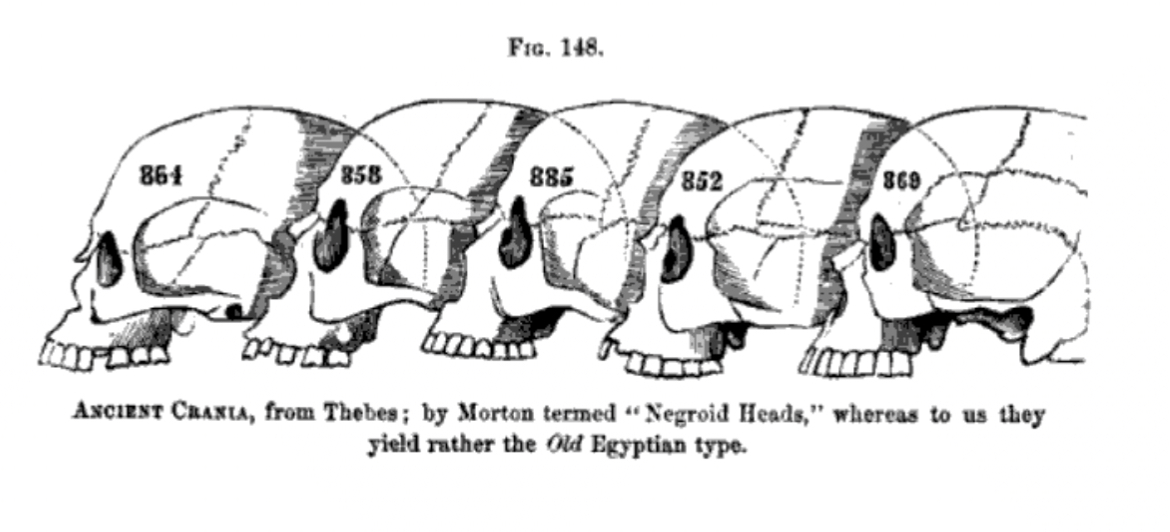
Figure 148 Types of Mankind P. 226. Coauthored by George Gliddon

== Works ==
- “Observations on Cornine, (an Alkaline Principle, recently obtained from the bark of Cornus Florida, By George W. Carpenter of Philadelphia).” The Philadelphia Journal of the Medical and Physical Sciences 11 [n. s. 2]:195–198, 1825.
- “Description of the Fossil Shells characterizing the Atlantic Secondary Formation of New-Jersey and Delaware; including four new species.” Read on December 11, 1827, and January 1, 1828. Journal of the Academy of Natural Sciences of Philadelphia 6 (1): 72–73, 1829.
- “Geological Observations on the Secondary, Tertiary, and Alluvial Formations of the Atlantic Coast of the United States of America arranged from the notes of Lardiner Vanuxem,” Read on January 8, 1828. Journal of the Academy of Natural Sciences of Philadelphia 6 (1): 59–71, 1829.
- “On the analogy which exists between the Marl of New Jersey, Etc. and the Chalk formation of Europe,” Letter from S. G. Morton, MD to the Editor, dated February 14, 1832. American Journal of Science and Arts 22 (1): 90–91, 1832.
- Illustrations of Pulmonary Consumption: Its Anatomical Characters, Causes, Symptoms and Treatment. Philadelphia: Key & Biddle, 1834.
- Crania Americana; or, A Comparative View of the Skulls of Various Aboriginal Nations of North and South America: To which is Prefixed An Essay on the Varieties of the Human Species. Philadelphia: J. Dobson, 1839.
- Catalogue of the Skulls of Man and the Inferior Animals in the Collection of Samuel George Morton, Philadelphia: Turner and Fisher, 1840.
- A Memoir of William Maclure, Esq. Philadelphia: T. K. and P. G. Collins, 1841.
- Editor for Benjamin Ellis. The Medical Formulary: Being a Collection of Prescriptions Derived from the Writings and Practice of Many of the Most Eminent Physicians in America and Europe. Philadelphia: Lea and Blanchard, 1842.
- Editor for John Makintosh. Principles of Pathology and Practice of Medicine, 4th American Ed. Philadelphia, Lindsay and Blakiston, 1844.
- An Inquiry into the Distinctive Characteristics of the Aboriginal Race of America. Philadelphia: John Penington, 1844.
- Catalogue of the Skulls of Man and the Inferior Animals in the Collection of Samuel George Morton, 2nd Ed. Philadelphia: F. Turner, 1843.
- Crania Aegyptiaca; or Observations on Egyptian Ethnography Derived from Anatomy, History and the Monuments. Philadelphia: John Pennington, 1844.
- “On a supposed new species of Hippopotamus,” Meeting of February 27, 1844. Proceedings of the Academy of Natural Sciences of Philadelphia 2 (2): 14–17, 1844.
- Hybridity in Animals and Plants, Considered in Reference to the Question of the Unity of the Human Species. New Haven: B.L. Hamlen, 1847.
- An Illustrated System of Human Anatomy. Philadelphia: Grigg, Elliot and Co., 1849.
- Catalogue of the Skulls of Man and the Inferior Animals in the Collection of Samuel George Morton, 3rd Ed. Philadelphia: Merrihew and Thompson, 1849.
- “On the Size of the Brain in the Various Races and Families of Man.” In Types of Mankind, 8th Ed. Josiah Nott and George Gliddon, eds. Pp. 298–327. Philadelphia: J. B. Lippencott - London: Trübner and Co., 1850.
- “Physical Type of the American Indians.” In Historical and Statistical Information Respecting the History, Condition, and Prospects of the Indian Tribes of the United States. Vol. II, Pp. 315–335. Henry Schoolcraft. Philadelphia: Lippincott, Grambo, 1851.
- “Exerpta from Morton’s Inedited Manuscripts.” In Types of Mankind. Josiah Knot and George Gliddon, eds., pp. 298–327. Philadelphia: J. B. Lippencott - London: Trübner and Co., 1855.

== See also ==
- Anthropometry
- Craniometry
- Drapetomania
- Hamitic hypothesis
- John Hanning Speke
- Paul Broca
- Paul Topinard
- Race (historical definitions)
- Race and intelligence
