= Nathaniel Rogers (minister) =

Nathaniel Rogers (1598–1655) was a Puritan clergyman in England and New England. According to the Dictionary of National Biography article on Rogers (published 1897), his descendants in America were at that time more numerous than those of any other early English emigrant family.

== Life ==
Coat of Arms of Nathaniel Rogers

He was the second son of John Rogers, by his first wife, and was born at Haverhill, Suffolk, in 1598. He was educated at Dedham grammar school and Emmanuel College, Cambridge, which he entered as a sizar on 9 May 1614, graduating B.A. in 1617 and M.A. in 1621. For two years he was domestic chaplain to some person of rank, and then went as curate to John Barkham at Bocking, Essex. There Rogers, whose chief friends were Thomas Hooker, then lecturer at Chelmsford, and other Essex Puritans, adopted decidedly Puritan views. His rector finally dismissed him for performing the burial office over an eminent person without a surplice. Giles Firmin calls Rogers "a man so able and judicious in soul-work that I would have trusted my own soul with him", and describes his preaching in his father's pulpit at Dedham.

On leaving Bocking he was for five years rector of Assington, Suffolk. On 1 June 1636 he sailed with his wife and family for New England, where they arrived in November. Rogers was ordained pastor of Ipswich, Massachusetts, on 20 February 1638, when he succeeded Nathaniel Ward as co-pastor with John Norton. On 6 September he took the oath of freedom at Ipswich, and was soon appointed a member of the synod, and one of a body deputed to reconcile a difference between the legalists and the antinomians. He died at Ipswich on 3 July 1655, aged 57.

== Works ==
Rogers published nothing but a letter in Latin to the House of Commons, dated 17 December 1643, urging church reform; it was printed in July 1644. It contained a few lines of censure on the aspersions of the king in a number of Mercurius Britannicus, to which the newspaper replied abusively on 12 August 1644. He also left in manuscript a treatise in Latin in favour of congregational church government, a portion of which is printed by Cotton Mather in his Magnalia Christi Americana.

== Family ==
By his wife Margaret (d. 23 January 1656), daughter of Robert Crane of Coggeshall, Essex, whom he married in 1626, Rogers had issue:

- Mary, baptised at Coggeshall on 8 February 1628, married to William Hubbard;
- John baptised at Coggeshall, Essex, on 23 January 1630, who became President of Harvard;
- and four sons (Nathaniel, Samuel, Timothy, and Ezekiel) born in Ipswich, Massachusetts. The youngest was left heir by his uncle Ezekiel Rogers.

== See also ==
- Sarah Rogers Haight (1808–1881), descendant, writer, international traveler
