= George Gliddon =

English-born American egyptologist

George Robbins Gliddon
- Born: 1809; St Thomas, Devonshire, England
- Died: November 16, 1857 (aged 47–48); Panama
- Occupations: United States vice-consul in Egypt, Egyptologist, race scientist, lecturer
- Known for: Theory that Egyptians descended from three sons of Noah—Ham, Shem, and Japheth—each of whom migrated to different areas in Africa and the Middle East
- Spouse: Anne Gliddon (m. 1846; died 1857)

George Robbins Gliddon (1809 – November 16, 1857) was an English-born American Egyptologist. He worked as a United States vice-consul in Egypt and assisted Muhammad Ali Pasha's plans to modernize Egypt by obtaining sugar, rice, and other mills from the United States. In 1841, he became frustrated with Pasha's destruction of archaeological sites and wrote Appeal to the Antiquaries of Europe on the Destruction of the Monuments of Egypt.

Gliddon worked with Samuel George Morton to define the race and physical type of the ancient Egyptians, published in the article Crania Aegyptiaca, one of several publications that Gliddon worked on. He created interest in the field of Egyptology through his lectures in the United States, including the Panorama of the Nile with Egyptian mummies.

== Early life and career ==
He was born in 1809 in St Thomas, Devonshire, England, the son of cousins Eleanor Gliddon and John G. Gliddon. His father a banker in London. Shortly after his birth, the Gliddons moved to Malta and lived there eight years. His father worked in the trade business. During that time, Gliddon's three sisters were born, Ellen, Johanna, and Emma. His father was a merchant and United States consular agent at Alexandria. Gliddon spent the rest of his childhood in Egypt. He returned to England for his education, after which he worked in Glasgow at a counting house, but did not stay there long.

Gliddon returned to Egypt by 1829, and worked for his father who was director of the Alexandrian Insurance Company. John was also promoted to consul, for the only consulate office in Egypt at that time. He became a United States vice-consul in the new consulate office in Cairo, subordinate to the office in Alexandria, beginning September 11, 1833. He was appointed to the position by his father.

He took a great interest in Egyptian antiquities. Father and son, in a quest for commercial enterprises between Egypt and America, developed relationships with Americans traveling to Egypt, including Sarah Rogers and Richard K. Haight, for whom he offered a guided trip down the Nile on his boat in the 1830s. In addition to several excursions, Gliddon sought to make American travelers comfortable by offering them lodging in his mansion and performed other favors which led to life-long connections with the Americans. Due to the stellar reviews that Gliddon received, including the actions he took when Cairo was quarantined due to epidemics, his request for the consulate to become an agency independent of Cairo was approved. He co-founded an organization to help foreigners in Egypt in 1836.

He also developed relationships with visiting British people and governmental and other Egyptian leaders. He was friends of Egyptologists Jean-François Champollion, Samuel Birch, and Karl Richard Lepsius. Gliddon assisted Muhammad Ali Pasha's plans to modernize Egypt by suggesting the use of American machinery for mills. Gliddon traveled to the United States in 1836 and contracted for a variety of mills to be used in Egypt, including sugar and rice mills. The consulate office in Cairo was closed in 1840, after which Gliddon discontinued his work on commercial ventures with people in the United States and sailed to England.

== Egyptology lectures ==
Gliddon took a deep interest in the studies of Jean-François Champollion, Ignatius Bonomi, Henry Salt, Howard Vyse, and other Egyptian scholars and explorers. He came to the United States in 1842 and lectured in New York, Philadelphia, Boston, St. Louis, and other places along the east of the Mississippi. He succeeded in attracting attention to the subject of Egyptology. His lectures were published and well-read. Richard K. Haight, sponsored Gliddon's lectures to spread knowledge about ancient Egypt in American cities. Sarah Rogers Haight, his wife, wrote about their travels to Egypt, which also sparked interest. Richard Haight also supported Gliddon as he studied with Egyptian scholars in Europe. Gliddon studied with Samuel Birch, Baron Bunsen, Émile Prisse d'Avennes, Karl Richard Lepsius, and Jean-Antoine Letronne.

Gliddon created a Panorama of the Nile rolling painting show with four Egyptian mummies. In late 1851 he used it during a presentation at the Chinese Museum in Boston. In Philadelphia in 1852 he made souvenirs of the material used to wrap the mummies. Using mummies in presentations sparked interest and attendance at Egytology lectures.

== Study of Egyptian peoples' origins ==
=== Crania Aegyptiaca ===
With his father, Gliddon collected mummy skulls for Samuel George Morton, for a total of 137 crania that remained intact after shipping. He collected the skulls from ancient tombs, sepulchral caverns of Egypt, and Cairo's vast necropolis (Note: The collection of skulls later went to the University of Pennsylvania.) Morton, author of Crania Americana, acquired 100 Egyptian crania specimens. The two men shared many views on human races and ultimately collaborated on their studies and publications.

Gliddon measured and studied the skulls and concluded, like Augustus Granville, that ancient Egyptians were racially European. The result was an elaborate work dedicated to Gliddon and published the American Philosophical Society in Philadelphia, entitled Crania Aegyptiaca (1844), about the race and physical type of the ancient Egyptians. Their theory, and that of John Speke's, was the reigning opinion of Europeans for some time about Africans of foreign descent—Caucasian, Aryan, Hamitic, Abyssinian, Galla, and Wahuma—which was that,

all were the progeny of ancient invaders from the Middle East who had conquered Abyssinia and then moved into East Africa, sometimes intermarrying with black Africans, sometimes driving them out, and sometimes ruling over them as a racially separate royal class.

=== Biblical theory and polygenesis ===
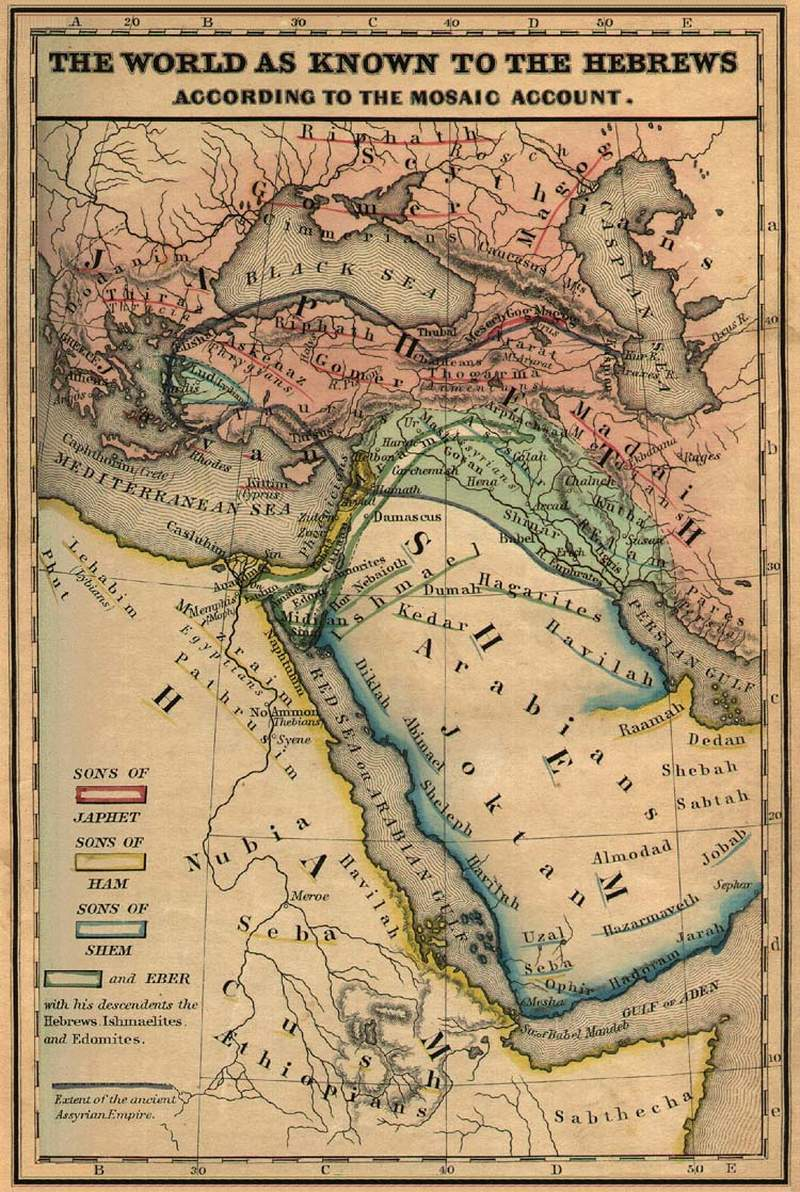
The world as known to the Hebrews according to the Mosaic account (1854 map, Historical Textbook and Atlas of Biblical Geography by Lyman Coleman). A color-coded map of Noah's sons'—Ham, Shem, and Japheth—land

Gliddon concluded that there were three types of Caucasians—Ham, Shem, and Japheth—based upon on a Biblical perspective (i.e., three sons of Noah). Gliddon and Morton's theories are based upon where the sons and their groups moved to and what indigenous people they came in contact with in their new homelands. The conclusion bolstered the polygenist argument and lead to Louis Agassiz sharing the same opinion and beginning of the "American School" of anthropology.

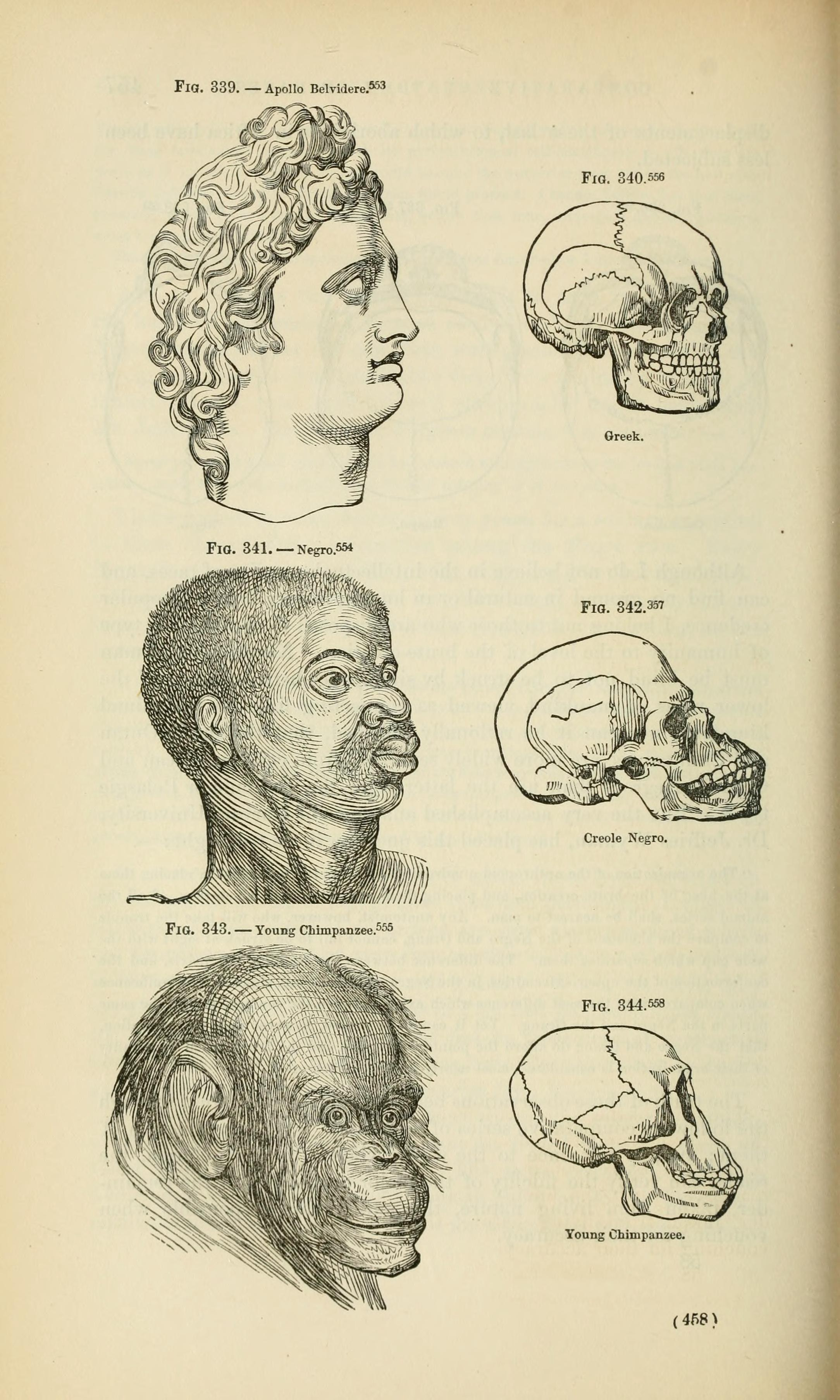
Drawings from Josiah C. Nott and George Gliddon's Indigenous races of the earth (1857), which promoted scientific racism with the suggestion that black people ranked between white people and chimpanzees in terms of intelligence

From his studies of ancient Egyptian monuments and hieroglyphics, Gliddon developed his theory that early ancient Egyptians had been white, and that even in the ancient world there had been distinctly different races. He posited that Whites and Negroes had never changed their racial appearance and features. He believed that neither environment or climate could change a race into another. He rejected Monogenesis, and claimed that the Bible supported Polygenesis. Gliddon believed the differences of the races had been impressed upon them by the Creator himself since the beginning.

Upon further research, Morton and Gliddon's opinions about Biblical genealogical theory changed, doing away with Hamitic, Japhetic, and Semitic terms to categorize racial and linguistic groups.

=== Craniology and cephalic index ===
Gliddon and Morton relied on craniology, evaluating facial angle and volume, to identify racial and linquistic groups. Other race scientists used the cephalic index, which resulted in more groups and greater commonality of skull shapes within those groups. Other elements, often hard to discern, were the gender, age, and whether they had sufficient food to avoid starvation to perform a meaningful study.

=== Types of mankind ===
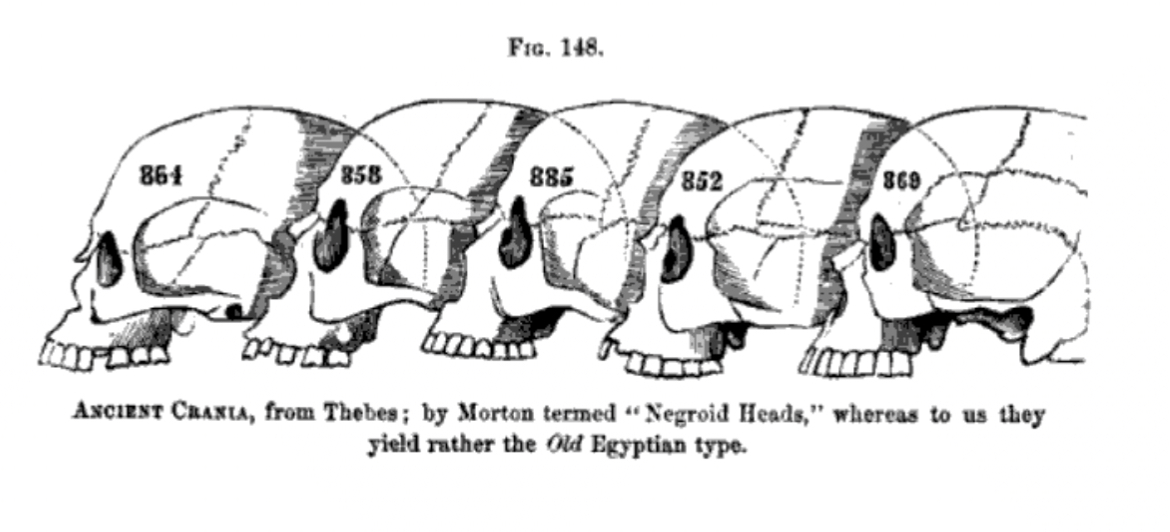
Figure 148 Types of Mankind p. 226 illustrated by Anne Gliddon

Gliddon went to Mobile, Alabama to work with Josiah C. Nott on their book Types of Mankind. It was a one-year endeavor that included his wife, Anne Gliddon who illustrated the book. It was completed in 1853 and published in 1854.

== Evolving views on race of the Egyptians ==
While originally believing that the Egyptians were purely Caucasian, the authors of Types of Mankind (1854) modified their views based on excavations from earlier dynasties. In their view, the earliest Egyptians were neither Caucasian or Negro but an intermediate Negroid type. However, they still believed that pure Negroes existed in Egypt only as slaves:

But, while it must be conceded that Negroes, at no time within the reach even of monumental history, have inhabited any of Egypt, save as captives; it may, on the other hand, be equally true, that the ancient Egyptians did present a type intermediate between other African and Asiatic races; and, should such be proved to have been the case, the autocthones of Egypt must cease to be designated by the misnomer of "Caucasian."

Specifically, in 1854, Josiah Nott and George R. Gliddon noted that according to majority of ethnographers and Samuel George Morton's own anthropological works, "the Fellahs of Upper and Middle Egypt, at the present day, continue to be an unmistakable race, and are regarded by most travelled authorities as the best living representatives of the ancient population of Egypt." They would also take the position that, "the iconographic monuments of the IVth, Vth, and VIth dynasties, is closely analogous to the predominant type of that day; which fact serves to strengthen our view that the Egyptians of the early dynasties were rather of an African or Negroid type-resembling the Bishari in some respects, and in others the modern Fellah, or peasantry of Upper Egypt."

In the 19th century the word "Negro" is reserved only for people who display the highest degree of stereotypical black African characteristics, with the suffix oid in "Negroid" making the word literally mean "Negro like". From the 1911 Encyclopædia Britannica "It is most convenient, however, to refer to the dark-skinned inhabitants of this zone by the collective term of Negroids, and to reserve the word Negro for the tribes which are considered to exhibit in the highest degree the characteristics taken as typical of the variety."

Samuel Morton addressed several letters to George Gliddon and stated that he modified many of his old views on ancient Egypt, believing their origins to be similar to Barabra populations, but not Negroes.

== Personal life ==
For a period of time, Gliddon lived in Bayswater, home to fashionable London socialites who lived a "kind of conjugal experiment". Gliddon was related to Leigh Hunt and his children, his sister Kate was the wife of Thornton Leigh Hunt and Hunt's daughter married George's brother John. Gliddon visitd the house, but never lived there. He was remembered as "that handsome Egyptologist, George Gliddon" by a regular visitor.

Gliddon married his cousin Anne Gliddon, daughter of John Gliddon of Holly Terrace, Highgate, London. They married in Paddington, London in April 1846. Anne was an artist and illustrator. Gliddon and a 17-year-old Henry A. Gliddon went to the United States for another lecture series in major cities like Boston, New York, Charleston, and Philadelphia from October 1846 until August 1848.

The couple had a son, Charles Americus Quarite Gliddon, who was born about 1847 with birth defects. Charles at age 9 traveled with his parents to New York City in 1856.

== Later years and death ==
George Robbins Gliddon was an agent for the Honduras Railroad Company in 1857, hired for his experience opening the Suez or Overland route to India. He took a medical leave of absence and died in his hotel room in Panama of yellow fever on November 16, 1857. He was buried in Panama but later re-interred in Philadelphia at Laurel Hill Cemetery at the instigation of his friend, archaeologist E. G. Squier.

Three years after his death, Anne (52, born in England) and Charles (13, born in England) lived on Long Island in Islip, New York. Charles was a talented artist, who died as a young man in 1872. He was buried in Kensington and Chelsea, London, England. She died in 1878.

== Publications ==
Significant publications

- Gliddon, George R. (1841). Memoir on the Cotton of Egypt. London: James Madden & Company.
- Gliddon, George R. (1841), An appeal to the Antiquaries of Europe on the destruction of the monuments of Egypt, London: James Madden & Company
- Gliddon, George R. (1843), Ancient Egypt, New York: New world
- Morton, Samuel George (1844), Crania Aegyptiaca, Contributor George R. Gliddon, Philadelphia: American Philosophical Society
- Gliddon, George R. (1849). Otia Aegytpiaca: Discourses on Egyptian Archaeology. London, New York: J. Madden; Bartlett and Welford.
- Gliddon, George R. (1849). "Hand-book to the American Panorama of the Nile". London: James Madden.
- Nott, Josiah C.; Gliddon, George R.; Morton, Samuel George; Agassiz, Louis; Usher, William; Patterson, Henry S. (1854). Types of Mankind. Anne Gliddon (illustrator of 360 wood-cuts, as well as the lithographed Berlin-effigies), A. Frey (Artist). Philadelphia: Lippincott, Grambo & Company. (Note: Later published with the title Encyclopaedia of ethnology by Cosmo Publications.)
- Maury, L.-F.-Alfred; Pulszky, Ferencz Aurelius; Meigs, James Aitken (1857). Nott, Josiah C.; Gliddon, George R. (eds.). Indigenous Races of the Earth. Philadelphia: J.B. Lippincott.

== Bibliography ==
- Nott, Josiah Clark; Gliddon, George R. (1854). Types of Mankind Or Ethnological Researches, Based Upon the Ancient Monuments, Paintings, Sculptures, and Crania of Races, and Upon Their Natural, Geographical, Phililogical, and Biblical History. Trübner.
- Robinson, Michael F. (Michael Frederick) (2016). The lost white tribe : explorers, scientists, and the theory that changed a continent. New York: Oxford University Press. ISBN 978-0-19-997848-9.
- Vivian, Cassandra (2012). "Chapter 8. The Gliddons and the Beginning of American-Egyptian Relations". Americans in Egypt, 1770-1915. McFarlane. pp. 95–111. ISBN 978-0-7864-9116-2.
