= Anne Gliddon =

English artist and illustrator (1807–1878)

- Born: 1807; Holly Terrace, Highgate, London
- Died: 1878 (aged 70–71)
- Occupations: Artist and illustrator
- Spouse: George Gliddon (m. 1846; died 1857)

Anne Gliddon (1807–1878) was a British artist and illustrator. She worked with graphite, ink, and watercolor, creating portraits and landscapes of British churches, almshouses, and distinctive houses as well as landscapes of South Australia. Her portraits have been published in books about Leigh Hunt and Thornton Leigh Hunt, her brother-in-law. Gliddon illustrated Types of Mankind, a book that her husband George Gliddon and Josiah C. Nott published. She wrote a family records of her relatives which was incorporated in The Gliddons of London: 1760–1850.

== Early life and education ==
Anne Gliddon was born in 1807, the daughter of John Gliddon of Holly Terrace, Highgate, London. John (1785–1826) and his wife Sarah (1780–1826) had six children, Anne, John, Jane Sarah, Katherine, Mary, and Arthur William. Anne, whose nickname was Nanny, was the sister of Katherine (Kate) Gliddon, the wife of Thornton Leigh Hunt. Gliddon studied art under Thomas Charles Wageman.

== Career ==
Anne was an artist and illustrator. Gliddon made a portrait of Leigh Hunt in 1841, a circulor pencil drawing enhanced with white. A drawing of Leigh Hunt was published in the book Leigh Hunt on the Eight Sonnets of Dante.

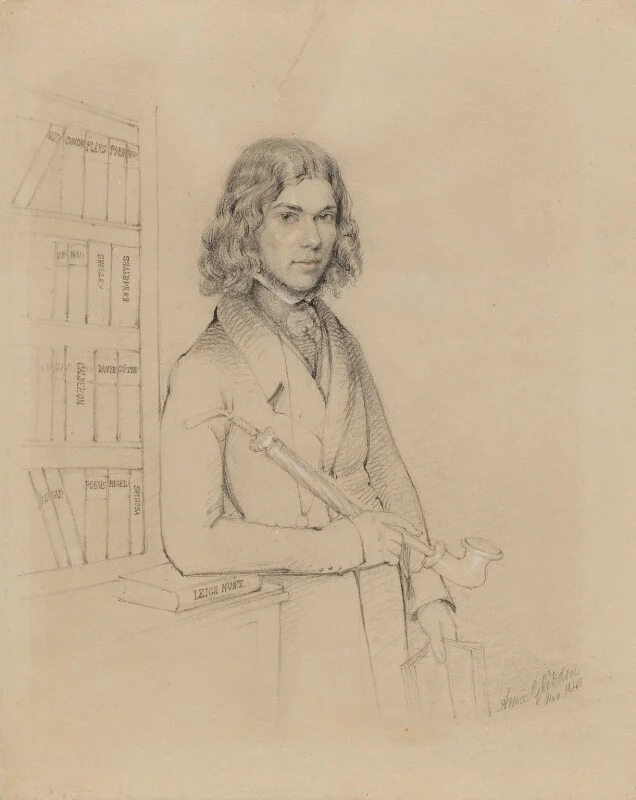
Anne Gliddon, George Henry Lewes, 1840, graphite and watercolor

Her portrait of George Henry Lewes, in graphite and watercolor is in the collection of the National Portrait Gallery. The image was published in two books about Lewes, a book about both Lewes and George Eliot in the 1830s, and a literary book,

- J. L. May, George Eliot (1830)
- A. T. Kitchel, George Lews and George Eliot (1830)
- B. C. Williams, George Eliot (1836)
- Harold Orel, Victorian literary critics (1984), in the book and on the jacket of the book

Anne made a series of portraits and lithographs of South Australia landscapes, some of which were in the collection of R. Blundell and Harvey Hewlings. Among her landscapes is a lithograph made c. 1839, On the Road to the Port, South Australia, printed in the book The Adelaide story.

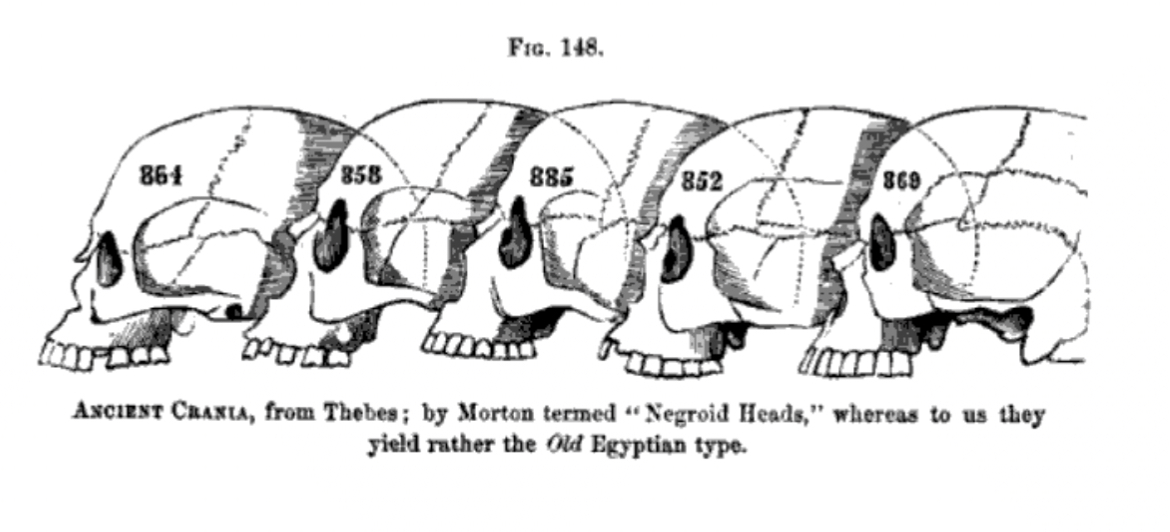
Types of Mankind P.226, illustrated by Anne Gliddon

The Gliddons lived in Mobile, Alabama for 12 months where George and Josiah C. Nott worked on their book Types of Mankind. Anne created the illustrations for the book, which was completed in 1853 and published in 1854. She made exacting drawings of 360 wood-cuts, as well as the lithographed Berlin-effigies. (Note: The authors wrote that the success of the book "depend[ed] its value and success" upon the exacting illustrations created by Anne Gliddon, who was "ever ready to alter or amend as our caprice, or necessity, might dictate.")

Gliddon wrote a family record of the Gliddons, The Gliddons of London: 1760–1850, which included information about her husband's career as a polygenist ethnologist. It was published by editor Wendy Norman.

== Marriage and child ==
Gliddon may have lived with other Gliddon cousins and children of Leigh Hunt in a communal lifestyle in Bayswater, home to fashionable London socialites who lived a "kind of conjugal experiment". Gliddon married her cousin George Gliddon in Paddington, London in April 1846. George and a 17-year-old Henry A. Gliddon went to the United States for Egyptology lecture series in major cities like Boston, New York, Charleston, and Philadelphia from October 1846 until August 1848.

The couple had a son, Charles Americus Quarite Gliddon, who was born about 1847 with birth defects. During the return trip to England from Mobile, Alabama about 1853, Charles was critically ill on board the ship. Charles at age nine traveled with his parents to New York City in 1856. He was a talented artist, who died as a young man in 1872. He was buried in Kensington and Chelsea, London, England.

== Later years and death ==
George Robbins Gliddon worked with a group of railroad men from Philadelphia on building a railway line that crossed the Isthmus of Panama, reducing the amount of time to around South America to the Pacific Ocean. He became ill with yellow fever and self-medicated with laudanum and opium. He received a medical leave of absence, but died in his Panama hotel room on November 16, 1857. He was buried in Panama but later re-interred in Philadelphia at Laurel Hill Cemetery at the instigation of his friend, archaeologist E. G. Squier.

Three years after his death, Anne and Charles lived on Long Island in Islip, New York. Living with them were two Mary Gliddons, one aged 22 and the other 52. After Anne Gliddon's death in 1878, her artist file was archived at the Frick Art Reference Library of the Frick Collection. The collection includes reproductions of works from auction catalogs and books, in black and white photographs and negatives.

== Gallery ==
Landscapes of South Australia

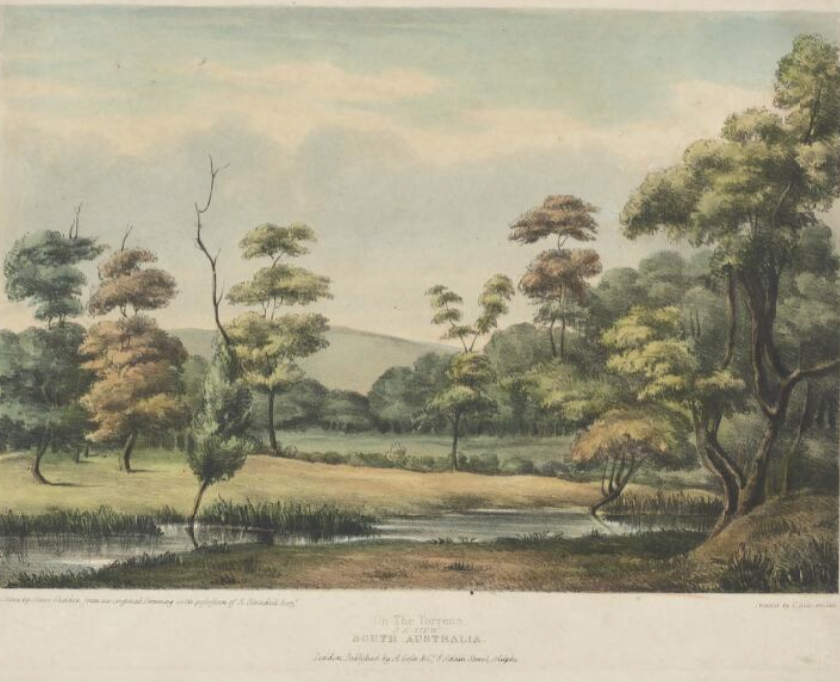
On the Torrens, SE view, South Australia, lithograph, 1839

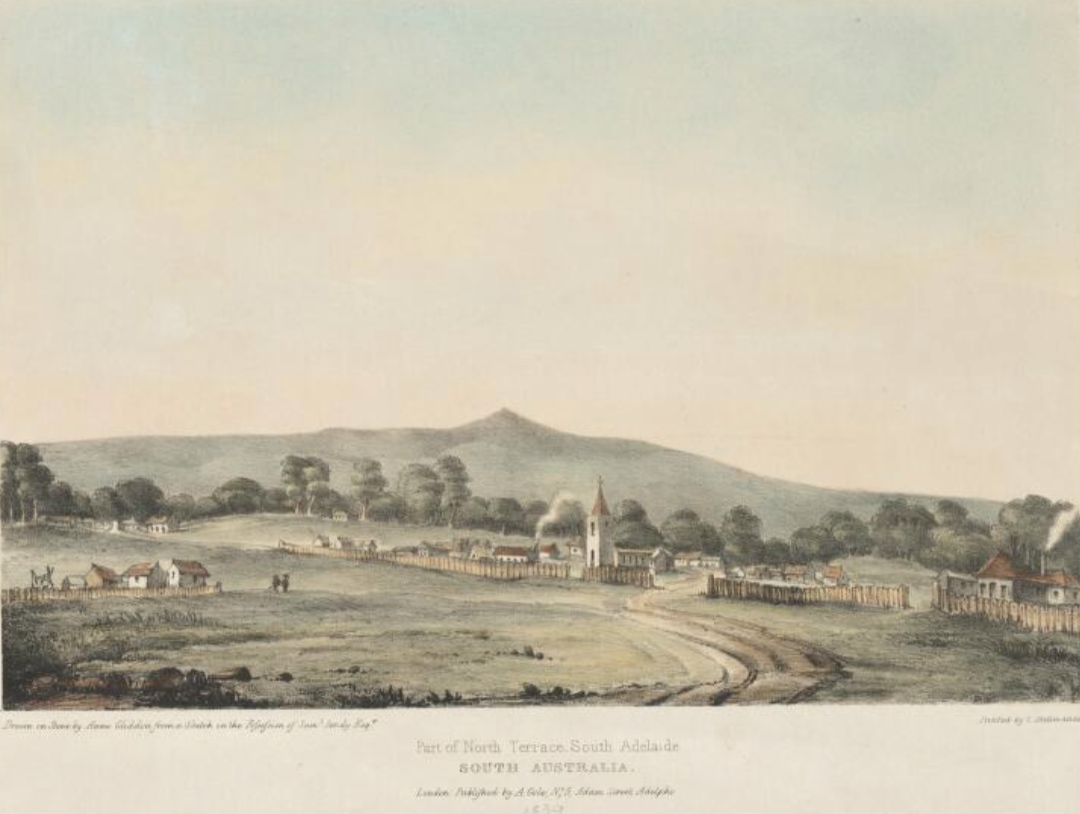
Part of North Terrace, South Adelaide, South Australia, lithograph, 1839
Yale Center for British Art

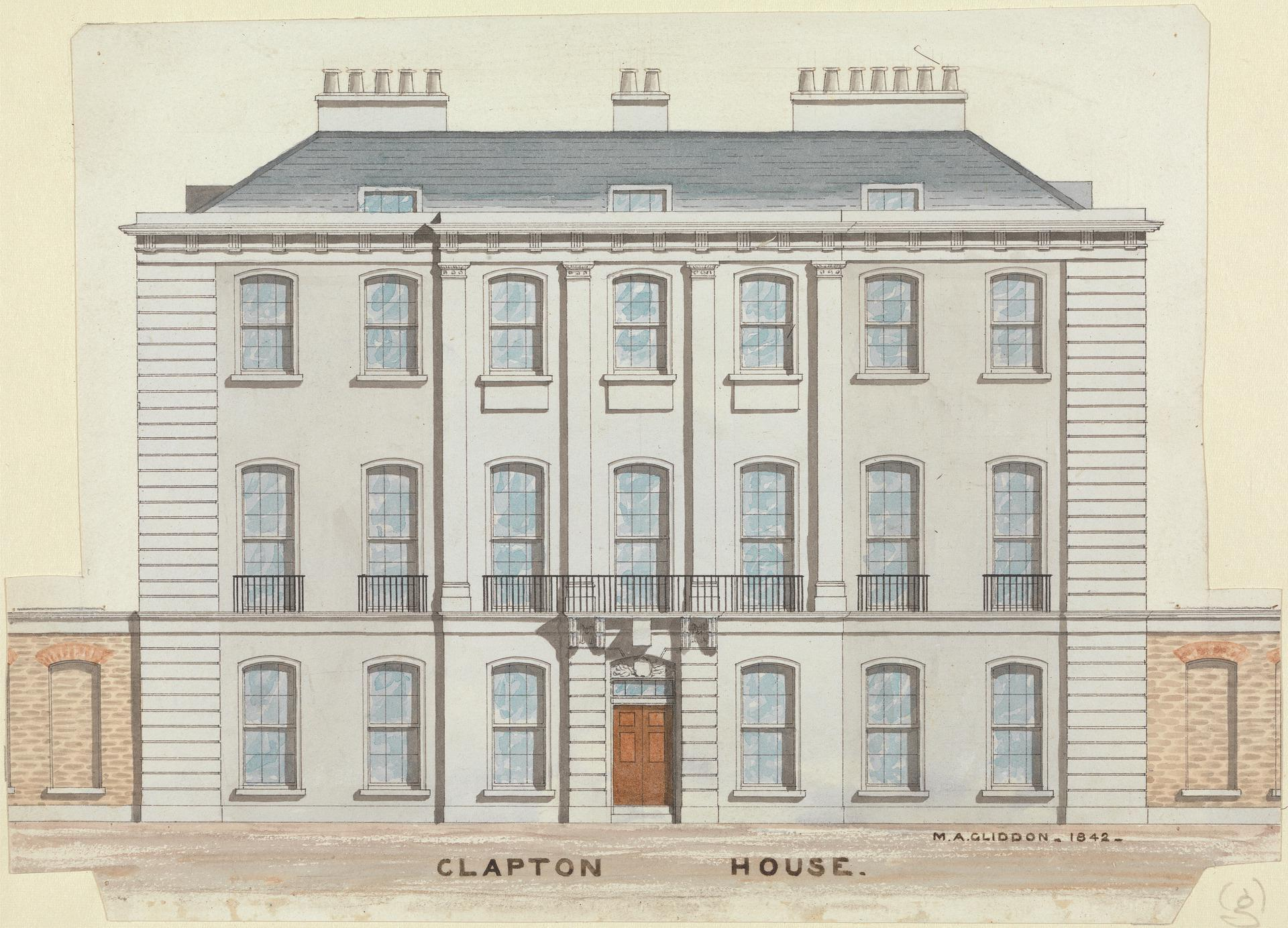
Clapton House, watercolor over graphite, 1842

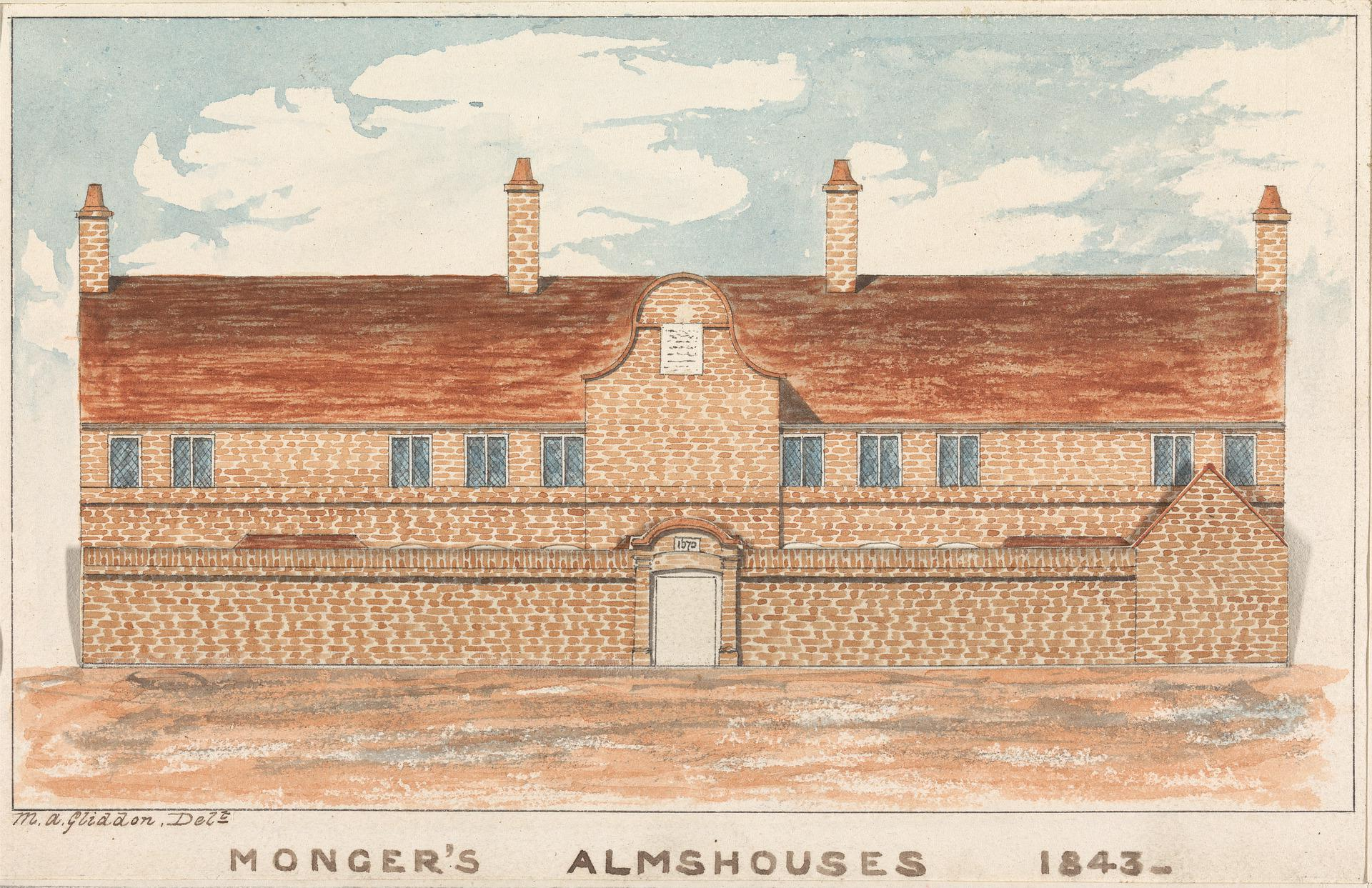
Monger's Almshouse, watercolor with pen and brown ink over traces of graphite, 1843

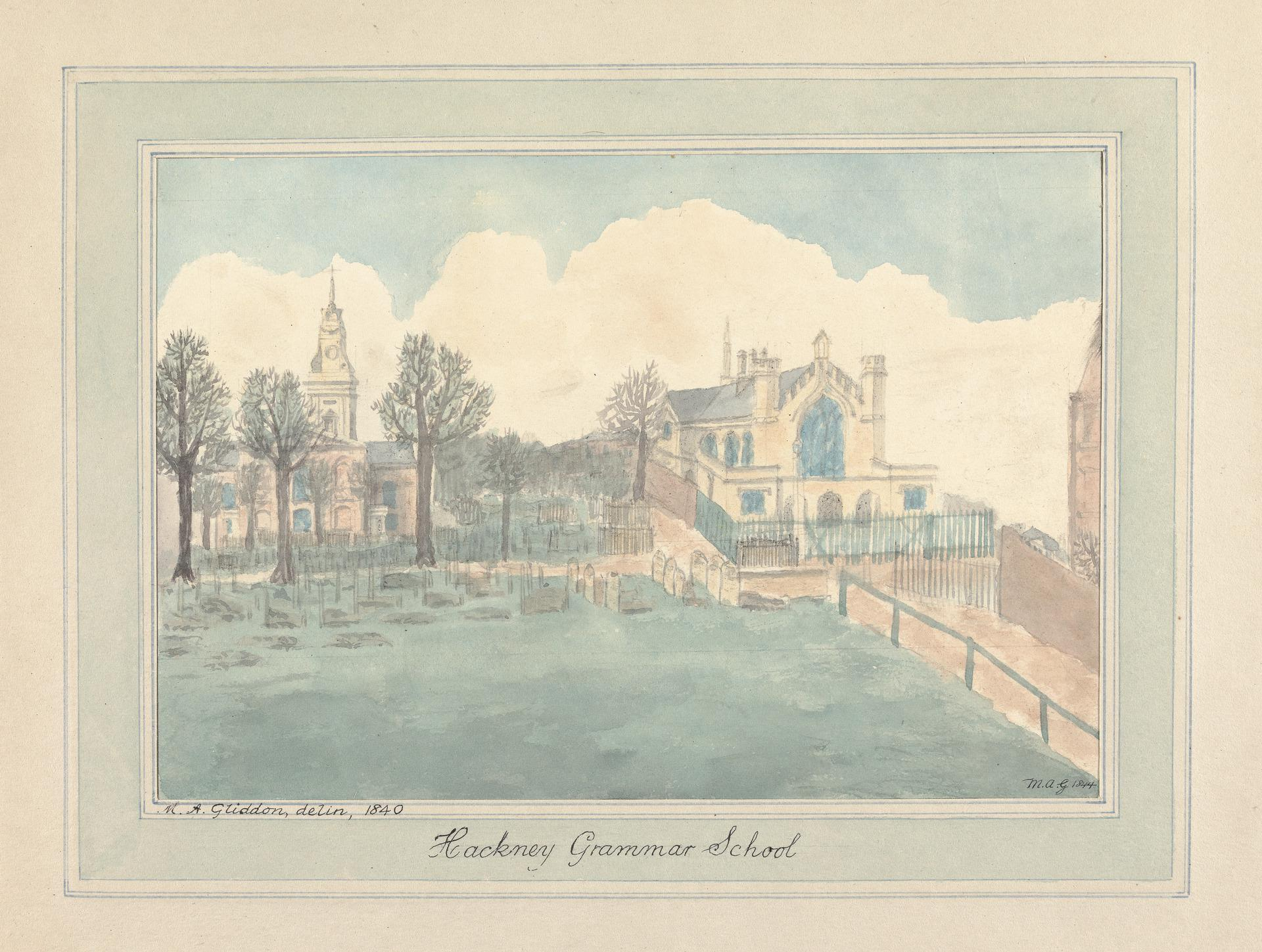
Hackney Grammar School, watercolor over graphite, 1844

== Bibliography ==
- Vivian, Cassandra (2012). "Chapter 8. The Gliddons and the Beginning of American-Egyptian Relations". Americans in Egypt, 1770-1915. McFarlane, Incorporated. pp. 95–111. ISBN 978-0-7864-9116-2.
