= Polygenism =

Theory of plural human origins

Polygenism is a theory of human origins which posits the view that humans are of different origins (polygenesis). This view is opposite to the idea of monogenism, which posits a single origin of humanity. Modern scientific views find little merit in any polygenic model due to an increased understanding of speciation in a human context, with the monogenic "Out of Africa" hypothesis and its variants being the most widely accepted models without supporting evidence of later archaeological sites for human origins. Polygenism has historically been heavily used in service of white supremacist ideas and practices, disproving a common origin between European and non-European peoples by considering archaeological evidence found from modern day DNA sequences comparing hominid species and modern humans. It can be distinguished between Biblical polygenism, describing a Pre-Adamite or Co-Adamite origin of certain races in the context of the Genesis narrative of Adam and Eve, and scientific polygenism, attempting to find a taxonomic basis for ideas of racial science.

== Origins ==
Many oral traditions feature polygenesis in their creation stories. For example, Bambuti mythology and other creation stories from the pygmies of Congo state that the supreme God of the pygmies, Khonvoum, created three different races of humans separately out of three kinds of clay: one black, one white, and one red. In some cultures, polygenism in the creation narrative served an etiological function. These narratives provided an explanation as to why other people groups exist who are not affiliated with their tribe. Moreover, distinctions made between the creation of foreign people groups and the tribe or ethnic group to which the creation myth pertains served to reinforce tribal or ethnic unity, the need to exercise wariness and caution when dealing with outsiders, or the unique nature of the relationship between that tribe and the deities of their religious system.

An example may be found in the creation myth of the Asmat people, a hunter-gatherer tribe situated along the south-western coast of New Guinea. This creation myth asserts that the Asmat themselves came into being when a deity placed carved wooden statues in a ceremonial house and began to beat a drum. The statues became living humans and began to dance. Some time later, a great crocodile attempted to attack this ceremonial house, but was defeated by the power of the deity. The crocodile was cut into several pieces and these were tossed in different directions. Each piece became one of the foreign tribes known to the Asmat.

The idea is also found in some ancient Greek and Roman literature. For example, the Roman Emperor Julian the Apostate in his Letter to a Priest wrote that he believed Zeus made multiple creations of man and women. In his Against the Galileans Julian presented his reasoning for this belief. Julian had noticed that the Germani and the Scythians (northern nations) were different in their bodies (i.e. complexion and other traits) to the Ethiopians. He therefore could not imagine such difference in physical attributes as having originated from common ancestry, and so maintained separate creations for different races.

In early classical and medieval geography the idea of polygenism surfaced because of the suggested possibility of there being inhabitants of the antipodes (Antichthones). These inhabitants were considered by some to have separate origins because of their geographical extremity.

The religion of the Ainu people claims that the ancestors of the Ainu people arrived on Earth from the skies separate from the other races. See Ainu creation myth.

== Definition ==
In their respective fundamentalist or Orthodox sects, Jewish people, Christians, and Muslims have embraced monogenism in the form that all modern humans ultimately are descended from a single mating pair, named Adam and Eve. In this context, polygenism covers all alternative explanations for the origin of humankind that involved more than two individual "first people". This definition of polygenism is still employed among some Creationists, and is also the definition used by the Roman Catholic Church (see Humani generis).

With the development of the evolutionary paradigm of human origins, it has become widely held within the scientific community that at no point did there exist a single "first man" and a single "first woman" who constituted the first true humans to whom all lineages of modern humans ultimately converge and that if Adam and Eve ever existed as distinct historical persons, they were members of a much larger population of the same species. However, a common scientific explanation of human origins asserts that the population directly ancestral to all modern humans remained united as a single population by constant gene flow. Therefore, on the level of the entire human population, this explanation of human origin is classified as monogenism. All modern humans share the same origin from this single ancestral population.

Modern polygenists do not accept either theological or scientific monogenism. They believe that the variation among human racial types cannot be accounted for by monogenism or by evolutionary processes occurring since the proposed recent African origin of modern humans. Polygenists reject the argument that human races must belong to a single species because they can interbreed. There are several polygenist hypotheses, including biblical creationist polygenism and polygenist evolution.

== Polygenism within Biblical Interpretations ==
To make polygenism compatible with the Biblical account in the early chapters of the Book of Genesis, some argument is needed to the effect that what is in the Bible is incomplete. Three standard positions are:

- Pre-Adamism;
- Co-Adamism;
- The Incompleteness of the Table of Nations in Genesis 10.

In Christian terms, polygenesis remained an uncommon Biblical interpretation until the mid-19th century, and was largely considered heretical; however, it has been pointed out by some modern scholars that, while Pre-Adamism was strongly rejected by most and deemed heretical, Co-Adamism was not received with the same degree of hostility.

A major reason for the emergence of Biblical polygenism from around the 18th century was because it became noted that the number of races could not have developed within the commonly accepted Biblical timeframe. Francis Dobbs (1750–1811), an eccentric member of the Irish Parliament, believed in a different kind of biblical polygenism. In his Concise View from History written in 1800 he maintained that there was a race resulting from a clandestine affair between Eve and the Devil (see Serpent Seed).

Polygenism was heavily criticized, and later rejected in the early 20th century by the Catholic Church as incompatible with Church teaching. This was established by Pope Pius XII in the encyclical Humani generis (1950), on the grounds that polygenism is incompatible with the doctrine of Original Sin. The encyclical is explicit on the matter:

When, however, there is question of another conjectural opinion, namely polygenism, the children of the Church by no means enjoy such liberty. For the faithful cannot embrace that opinion which maintains that either after Adam there existed on this earth true men who did not take their origin through natural generation from him as from the first parent of all, or that Adam represents a certain number of first parents. Now it is in no way apparent how such an opinion can be reconciled with that which the sources of revealed truth and the documents of the Teaching Authority of the Church propose with regard to original sin, which proceeds from a sin actually committed by an individual Adam and which, through generation, is passed on to all and is in everyone as his own.

=== Pre-Adamism ===
Pre-Adamism claims there were already races of humans living before the creation of Adam. It traces back to Isaac La Peyrère in the 17th century.

=== Co-Adamism ===
Co-Adamism claims that there was more than one Adam – small groups of men, created at the same time in different places across the Earth – and therefore that the different races were separately created. The idea of co-Adamism has been traced back as far as Paracelsus in 1520. Other 16th century advocates of co-Adamism included Thomas Harriot and Walter Raleigh, who theorised a different origin for the Native Americans.

In 1591 Giordano Bruno argued that because no one could imagine that the Jews and the Ethiopians had the same ancestry, then God must have either created separate Adams or Africans were the descendants of pre-Adamite races.

An anonymous Biblical paper supporting co-Adamism was published in 1732 entitled Co-adamitae or an Essay to Prove the Two Following. Paradoxes, viz. I. That There Were Other Men Created at the Same time with Adam, and II. That the Angels did not fall.

Henry Home, Lord Kames was a believer in co-Adamism. Home believed God had created different races on Earth in separate regions. In his book Sketches of the History of Man in 1774 Home claimed that the environment, climate, or state of society could not account for racial differences, so that the races must have come from distinct, separate stocks.

Charles White was another advocate of co-Adamism, although he used less theology to support his views. White's Account of the Regular Gradation in Man in 1799, provided the empirical science for polygenism. White defended the theory of polygeny by refuting French naturalist Georges-Louis Leclerc, Comte de Buffon's interfertility argument: the theory that only the same species can interbreed – pointing to species hybrids such as foxes, wolves and jackals, which were separate groups that were still able to interbreed.

Charles Hamilton Smith, a naturalist from England, was a polygenist: he believed races had been created separately. He published the book The Natural History of the Human Species in 1848. In the book he maintained that there had always been three fundamentally distinct human types: the Caucasian, the Mongolian and the Negro. He also referred to the polygenist Samuel George Morton's work in America. Samuel Kneeland wrote an 84-page introduction to the American edition of the book where he laid out evidence which supports polygenist creationism and that the Bible is entirely compatible with multiple Adams.

John William Colenso, a theologian and biblical scholar, was a polygenist who believed in co-Adamism. Colenso pointed to monuments and artifacts in Egypt to debunk monogenist beliefs that all races came from the same stock. For example, Ancient Egyptian representations of races showed exactly how the races looked in his time. Egyptological evidence indicated the existence of remarkable permanent differences in the shape of the skull, bodily form, colour and physiognomy between different races which are difficult to reconcile with biblical monogenesis. Colenso believed that racial variation between races was so great, that there was no way in which all the races could have come from the same stock just a few thousand years ago. He was unconvinced that climate could change racial variation and also believed, in common with other biblical polygenists, that monogenists had interpreted the Bible wrongly.

Colenso said: "It seems most probable that the human race, as it now exists, had really sprung from more than one pair". Colenso denied that polygenism caused any kind of racist attitudes or practices; like many other polygenists he claimed monogenesis was the cause of slavery and racism. Colenso claimed that each race had sprung from a different pair of parents, and that all races were created equal by God.

=== Criticism of the Table of Nations ===
Biblical polygenists such as Colenso, Louis Agassiz, Josiah Clark Nott and George Gliddon maintained that many of the races on Earth, such as Africans and Asians, were not featured in the Table of Nations in Genesis 10.

Nott argued that its authors' knowledge was limited to their own region, and that the Bible does not concern the whole of the Earth's population. According to Nott, there are no verses in the Bible which support monogenism; and that the only passage the monogenists use is Acts 17:26, where (he wrote) the monogenists are wrong in their interpretation of this verse because the "one blood" of Paul's sermon only includes the nations he knew existed, which were local.

== Atheist Polygenism ==
According to Lansdown (2006), "Polygenism, the concept of different human species, was heretical and 'atheistic'; it was embraced only by the most isolated and heterodox thinkers". Atheist polygenism was most notably supported by Ephraim Squier (1821–1888). In Europe in the 19th century the general public had favored polygenism, as many believed it contradicted the Genesis account and thus was more scientific than religious monogenism.

The British atheist leader Charles Bradlaugh was also interested in the theory of polygenesis. He found it useful to undermine Genesis accounts of creation.

== Scientific Polygenism ==
Scientific polygenism is a set of hypotheses resulting from the use of the scientific method to attempt explanation of the differences in traits between humans who live in different regions. Over the course of many centuries, polygenistic hypotheses have been dismissed by more accurate scientific theories.

During the late 17th century and early 18th century many countries first began to encounter different races from other countries due to colonial expansion, discovery, overseas exploration and increases in trade routes. Because of the encounters with different races, many people could not believe that they had the same ancestry as other races, because of the extreme racial differences. Many explorers and scientists visited other countries to observe and study different races and write down their findings. Later they went back to their own countries to publish books and journals on their findings and claim that the evidence supported polygenism.

=== 18th century ===
Polygenists of the 18th century included Voltaire and David Hume. Voltaire in his 1734 book Traité de métaphysique wrote that "whites ... Negroes ... the yellow races ... are not descended from the same man". Voltaire brought the subject up in his Essay on the Manner and Spirit of Nations and on the Principal Occurrences in History in 1756 (which was an early work of comparative history). He believed each race had separate origins because they were so racially diverse. Voltaire found biblical monogenism laughable, as he expressed:

It is a serious question among them whether the Africans are descended from monkeys or whether the monkeys come from them. Our wise men have said that man was created in the image of God. Now here is a lovely image of the Divine Maker: a flat and black nose with little or hardly any intelligence. A time will doubtless come when these animals will know how to cultivate the land well, beautify their houses and gardens, and know the paths of the stars: one needs time for everything.

When comparing Caucasians to those with dark skin, Voltaire claimed they were different species:

The negro race is a species of men different from ours as the breed of spaniels is from that of greyhounds. The mucous membrane, or network, which nature has spread between the muscles and the skin, is white in us and black or copper-colored in them.

Historians have suggested that Voltaire's support for polygenism was shaped by his financial investments in French colonial companies, including the Compagnie des Indies.

John Atkins, an English naval surgeon, was one of the earliest scientists to be a proponent of the polygenist theory. In his book A Voyage to Guinea (1723) he said "I am persuaded that the black and white race have sprung from different coloured parents."

In the last two decades of the 18th century polygenism was advocated in England by historian Edward Long and anatomist Charles White, in Germany by ethnographers Christoph Meiners and Georg Forster, and in France by Julien-Joseph Virey. Virey's 1801 book Histoire naturelle du genre humaine was a transition from discourses of "varieties of the human race" to the idea of separate "human races".

=== 19th-century views ===
Polygenism was most widespread during the 19th century. The racial studies of Georges Cuvier, the French naturalist and zoologist, influenced scientific polygenism and scientific racism. These theories proposed a graduation from 'civilisation' to 'barbarism', at once justifying the European acquisition of foreign territories and highlighting the belief in the singular role of the Europeans as a civilizing force.

==== Georges Cuvier ====
Georges Cuvier, a French naturalist and zoologist, believed there were three distinct races: the Caucasian ("white"), the Mongolian ("yellow") and the Ethiopian ("black"). Cuvier claimed Adam and Eve were "Caucasian", forming the original race of mankind, while the other two races originated by survivors escaping in different directions after a major catastrophe hit the Earth 5,000 years ago, with those survivors then living in complete isolation from each other. Each race received marks for the beauty or ugliness of their skull and quality of their civilizations. According to Cuvier the white race was at the top and the black race was at the bottom.

Cuvier wrote regarding "Caucasians":

The white race, with oval face, straight hair and nose, to which the civilised people of Europe belong and which appear to us the most beautiful of all, is also superior to others by its genius, courage and activity.

Regarding those he termed "Ethiopian", Cuvier wrote:

The Negro race ... is marked by a black complexion, crisped or woolly hair, compressed cranium, and a flat nose. The projection of the lower parts of the face, and the thick lips, evidently approximate it to the monkey tribe; the hordes of which it consists have always remained in the most complete state of utter barbarism.

Cuvier's racial studies held the main features of polygenism, which are as follows:

- Fixity of species
- Strict limits on environmental influence
- Unchanging underlying type
- Anatomical and cranial measurement differences in races
- Physical and mental differences between racial worth
- Human races are all distinct

==== Prichard ====
Scientific polygenism became popular in France in the 1820s in response to James Cowles Prichard's Researches into the Physical History of Man (1813) which was considered a pioneering work of monogenism. An anthropological school advocating polygenism arose to counter Prichard's monogenism in France. Key French polygenists of this period included the naturalist Jean Baptiste Bory de Saint-Vincent and Louis-Antoine Desmoulins (1796–1828), a student of Georges Cuvier.

==== Retzius ====
Anders Retzius, a Swedish professor of anatomy, was a polygenist. Retzius studied many different skull types, and because the skulls were so different he believed that the races had a separate origin.

==== Later European trends ====
Polygenist schools arose in the 1830s and 1840s across Europe. The Scottish anatomist and zoologist Robert Knox spent the latter half of his career advocating for polygenism; he argued in his 1850 work The Races of Men that "[r]acial natures ... were unchanging over thousands of years, and were so different that they should be called different species". A colleague of Knox, James Hunt, was also a promoter of polygenism. In 1863, he published an article titled On the Negro's Place in Nature which was posthumously dedicated to Knox. In the controversial article, Hunt supported both polygenism and slavery in the Confederacy.

John Crawfurd, a Scottish physician and colonial administrator, was a polygenist. He studied the geography of where different races were located, and believed that different races had been created separately by God in specific regional zones for climatic circumstance.

==== American views ====
Charles Caldwell, born in 1772 and died in 1853, was one of the earliest supporters of polygenism in America. Caldwell attacked the position that environment was the cause of racial differences and argued instead that four races, Caucasian, Mongolian, American Indian, and African, were four different species, created separately by God.

Charles Pickering was a librarian and curator of the Academy of Natural Sciences. In 1843, he traveled to Africa and India to research human races. In 1848, Pickering published Races of Man and Their Geographical Distribution, which enumerated eleven races.

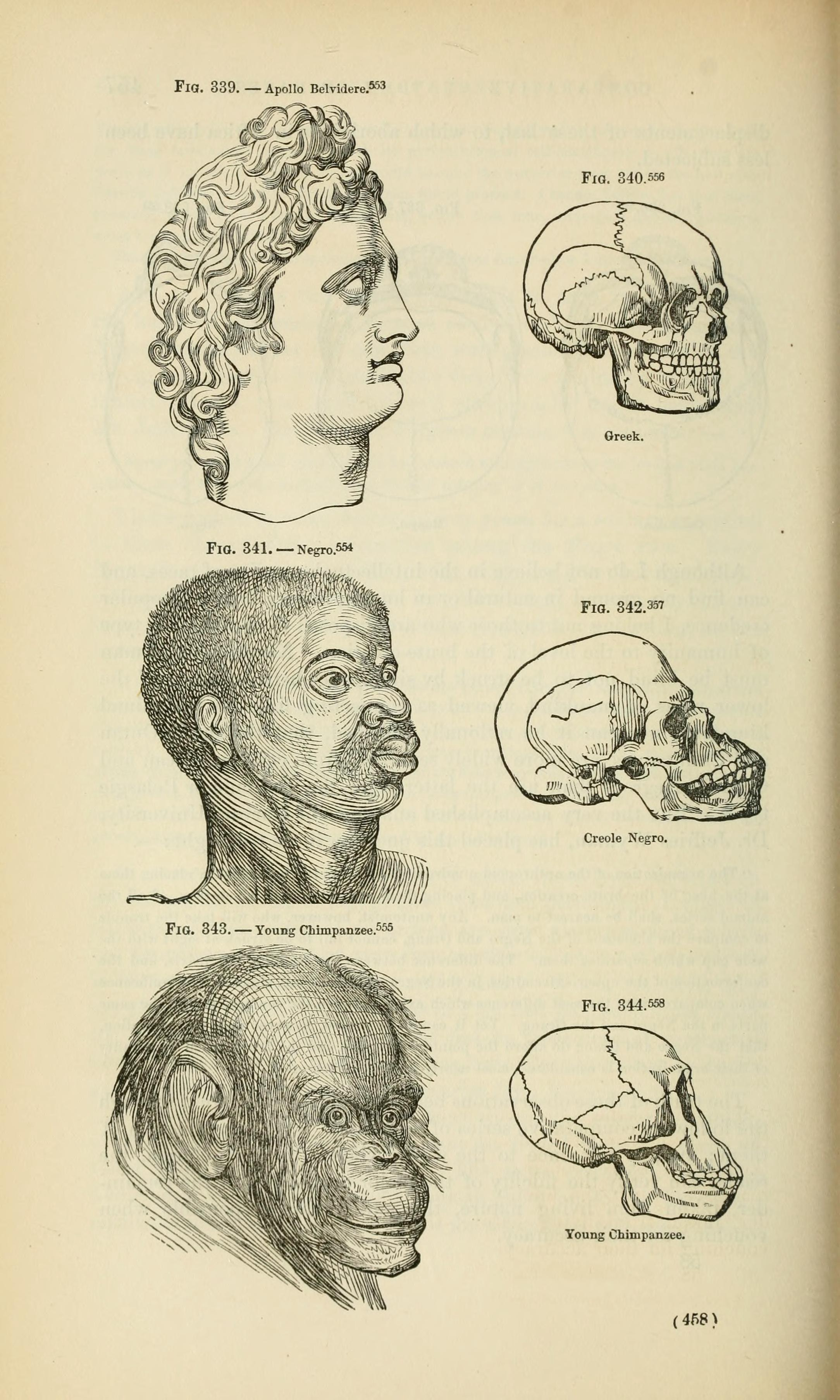
Indigenous Races of the Earth (1857). Josiah Clark Nott and George Robins Gliddon implied that "Negroes" were a creational rank between "Greeks" and chimpanzees.

Polygenism came into mainstream scientific thought in America in the mid 19th century with the work of several corresponding natural scientists such as Samuel George Morton and Charles Pickering as well as Egyptologist George Gliddon, the surgeon Josiah Clark Nott and more prominently the paleontologist and geologist Louis Agassiz in the United States. All had contributed to a major ethnological work of 738 pages entitled Types of Mankind which was published in 1854 and was a great success; it was followed by a sequel Indigenous Races of the Earth (1857). These works sparked the first formal Polygenist vs. Monogenist debates across America, and advocates of the polygenism school became known as pluralists. Since Louis Agassiz backed the pluralists, polygenism received mainstream public approval and wide exposure during the 1840s-1860s. Numerous articles promoting polygenist views were published in the American Journal of Science and Arts during this time period.

The archeologist Ephraim George Squier helped Morton's polygenism by excavating an ancient cranium from the midwestern mounds and sending a drawing of it to Morton. Morton found its similarities striking to Central and South American crania, confirming his belief that the American Indian nations had a common and indigenous origin. Morton's polygenism explicitly stated the Mound Builders were an American Indian race of great antiquity, they did not migrate from Asia, and their physical form has remained essentially unchanged in their descendants. Both Squier and Gliddon demonstrated for Morton the permanence of racial characteristics, and the suitability of each race to the region for which it had been created.

American Indians supported Morton's conclusions, whilst some white archaeologists supported Morton. Others such as William Pidgeon did not accept Morton's conclusions because at the time some white archaeologists such as Pidgeon could not believe that Native Americans had created the archaeological remains they saw around them; instead William Pidgeon wrote a book called Traditions of Dee-Coo-Dah and Antiquarian Researches in 1858. In the book Pidgeon attempts to prove that a vanished race, culturally superior to and existing earlier than the American Indians, occupied America first and that The Mound Builders were not Native Americans. Pidgeon's book was revealed mostly to be a hoax. The famed archaeologist Theodore H. Lewis later revealed that Pidgeon had fabricated most of his research and distorted much of the rest of it, mapping mounds where none existed and changing the arrangement of existing mound groups to suit his needs. Morton's work gained more support because his work was considered to be evidence of true objective science unlike others such as Pidgeon. Morton won his reputation as the great data-gatherer and objectivist of American Science. Oliver Wendell Holmes praised Morton for "the severe and cautious character" of his works, which "from their very nature are permanent data for all future students of ethnology".

By 1850 Agassiz had developed a unique form of co-Adamism. God he believed had created several different zoological provinces with different races in them, but also fauna and animals specific to those regions. An essay of Agassiz promoting this theory with maps of the zoological zones was attached as a preface to Types of Mankind in collaboration with Morton, Gliddon, Nott and others. Agassiz's theory developed some support amongst Christians, and he often wrote articles in Christian magazines claiming his views on polygenism were compatible with the bible. Christian fundamentalists however who held to Young Earth Creationism and strict monogenism (i.e. everyone on Earth from Adam and Eve) attacked his views, as well as those of Gliddon and Nott.

Unlike Josiah Nott, the slave-owner from Alabama, Agassiz was never a supporter of slavery. He claimed his views had nothing to do with politics.

==== Effect of evolutionary ideas and debates from the 1860s ====
The notion that races were separate and came together by hybridism, rather than being variations from a common stock, was cast into doubt with the publication of Darwin's Origin of Species in 1859, which Agassiz opposed till his death. Yet the influence of polygenism persisted for many years. For example, the Hamitic Hypothesis, which argued that certain African populations were the descendants of a proto-white invasion in the ancient past, was influenced by polygenism and continued to hold sway in linguistics and anthropology until the 1950s. Darwin did not address man's origin directly at this stage, and the argument continued for a number of years, with the creation of the Anthropological Society of London in 1863 in the shadow of the American Civil War, in opposition to the abolitionist Ethnological Society. The Anthropologicals had the Confederate agent Henry Hotze permanently on their council. The two societies did not heal their differences until they merged in 1871 to form the Anthropological Institute.

Georges Pouchet, the French naturalist and anatomist, was a polygenist. Pouchet made contributions in several scientific fields, and specialised in comparative anatomy of fishes and whales. He was a prime advocate of polygeny, and was the author of an anthropological work titled De la Pluralité des Races Humaines (1858), which was translated into English as The Plurality of the Human Race in 1864 by the Anthropological Society.

John Thurnam with Joseph Barnard Davis published a work in two volumes under the title of Crania Britannica in 1865, important for craniometry. Thurnam and Davis were both believers in polygenism, in the form that different races had been created separately. Davis was a collector of crania, and had over 1700 specimens. Because of the racial differences of the crania, Davis and Thurnam believed that proofs of polygenism were to be found in studying the skull types of different races. Davis also wrote Thesaurus craniorum: catalogue of the skulls of the various races of man (1875).

Although it took many years, polygenism, which required species to be created in specific geographic locations and to remain immutable, has been almost entirely replaced among scientists by Darwin's theory of evolution from a common ancestor. Persistent antagonism to Darwinian theory is today primarily a matter of religious or political viewpoint.

=== 20th Century ===
At least as late as 1919, the Journal of the American Medical Association published articles that seriously engaged with the possibility that Black and White people might have had separate origins.

== Polygenist evolution ==
Polygenist evolution is the belief that humans evolved independently from separate species of apes. This can be traced back to Carl Vogt in 1864. Polygenist evolution allowed polygenists to link each race to an altogether different ape. This was proposed by Hermann Klaatsch and F. G. Crookshank.

Carl Vogt believed that the inhabitants of Africa were related to the ape, and were separate from those of European descent. In Chapter VII of his Lectures of man (1864) he compared both ethnicities, describing them as "two extreme human types". The difference between them, he claimed, are greater than those between two species of ape; and this proves the two are a separate species altogether.

In an unusual blend of contemporary evolutionary thinking and pre-Adamism, the theistic evolutionist and geologist Alexander Winchell argued in his 1878 book Adamites and Preadamites for the pre-Adamic origins of the human race on the basis that Africans were too racially inferior to have developed from the Biblical Adam. Winchell also believed that the laws of evolution operated according to the will of God.

Before Darwin published his theory of evolution and common descent in his Origin of Species (1859), scientific theories or models of Polygenism (such as Agassiz's) were strictly creationist. Even after Darwin's book was published, Agassiz still stuck to his scientific form of polygenist creationism and denounced the idea of evolution. However, by the late 19th century most scientific polygenists had abandoned Agassiz's creationism and began to embrace polygenist forms of evolution. This even included many students of Agassiz, including Nathaniel Shaler, who had studied under Agassiz at Harvard. Shaler continued to believe in polygenism, but believed the different races evolved from different primates. The prominent French anthropologist Paul Broca by 1878 had also converted from creationist polygenism to accepting a form of polygenist evolution.

In his work The Descent of Man (1871), Charles Darwin and some of his supporters argued for the monogenesis of the human species, seeing the common origin of all humans as essential for evolutionary theory. This is known as the single-origin hypothesis. Darwin even dedicated a chapter of his The Descent of Man to an attempt to refute the polygenists and support common ancestry of all races. Polygenist evolution views however continued into the early 20th century, and still found support amongst prominent scientists.

Alfred Russel Wallace was also an advocate of polygenist evolution, claiming that the physical differences in races must have occurred at such a remote time in the past before humans had any intelligence, when natural selection was still operative on human bodies. The differentiation into separate races with distinct physical traits must have happened so soon after humans had just appeared on Earth that for all practical purposes all races had always been distinct.

In contrast to most of Darwin's supporters, Ernst Haeckel put forward a doctrine of evolutionary polygenism based on the ideas of the linguist and polygenist August Schleicher, in which several different language groups had arisen separately from speechless prehuman Urmenschen, which themselves had evolved from simian ancestors. These separate languages had completed the transition from animals to man, and, under the influence of each main branch of languages, humans had evolved as separate species, which could be subdivided into races. Haeckel divided human beings into ten races, of which the Caucasian was the highest and the primitives were doomed to extinction.

Haeckel claimed that Africans have stronger and more freely movable toes than any other race, which he interpreted as evidence that members of the race were closely related to apes. Reasoning that apes use their toes to cling tightly to tree branches, Haeckel compared Africans to "four-handed" apes. Haeckel also believed that Blacks were savages and that Whites were significantly more civilized.

== Modern religious adherents ==
- A tenet of Raëlism holds that the different races of humans were created by separate teams of extraterrestrial scientists.
- Several minor Christian groups still embrace Biblical polygenism (pre-Adamism or co-Adamism).

== See also ==
- Historical definitions of race
- Linguistic monogenesis and polygenesis
- Monogenism
- Multiregional origin of modern humans
- Nordic Indo-Germanic people
