= Josiah C. Nott =

American physician (1804–1873)

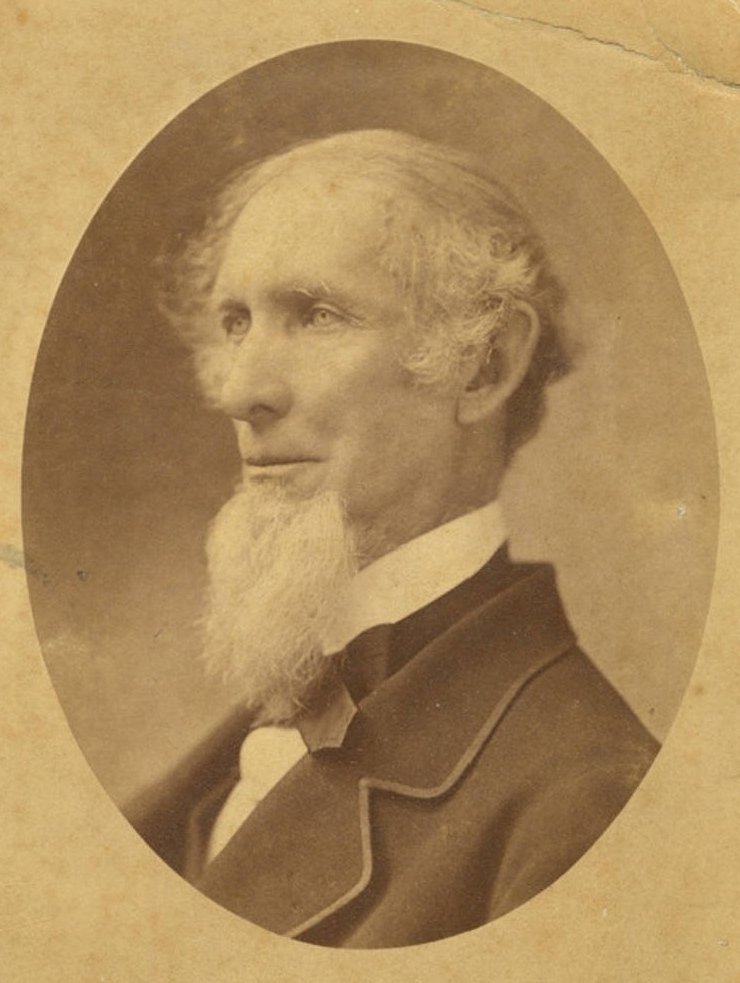
- Nott during the 1860s
- Born: Josiah Clark Nott; March 31, 1804; South Carolina, U.S.
- Died: March 31, 1873 (aged 69); Mobile, Alabama, U.S.
- Education: University of Pennsylvania
- Occupations: Surgeon, anthropologist
- Spouse: Sarah Cantey Deas (m. 1832)

Josiah Clark Nott (March 31, 1804 – March 31, 1873) was an American surgeon, anthropologist and ethnologist. He is known for his studies into the etiology of yellow fever and malaria, including the theory that they are caused by germs, and for his espousal of scientific racism.

Nott, a slave owner, used his scientific reputation to defend the institution of slavery. He claimed that "the negro achieves his greatest perfection, physical and moral, and also greatest longevity, in a state of slavery". Nott was influenced by the racial theories of Samuel George Morton (1799–1851), one of the inspirators of physical anthropology. Morton collected hundreds of human skulls from around the world and tried to classify them. Morton had been among the first to claim that he could judge the intellectual capacity of a race by the cranial capacity (the measure of the volume of the interior of the skull). A large skull meant a large brain and high intellectual capacity, and a small skull indicated a small brain and decreased intellectual capacity. By studying these skulls he came to the conclusion of polygenism, that each race had a separate origin.

== Early life and education ==
Nott was born on March 31, 1804, in the U.S. state of South Carolina. He was the son of the Federalist politician and judge Abraham Nott. He received his medical degree from the University of Pennsylvania in 1827 and completed his post-graduate training in Paris. He moved to Mobile, Alabama in 1833 and began a surgical practice.

== Career ==
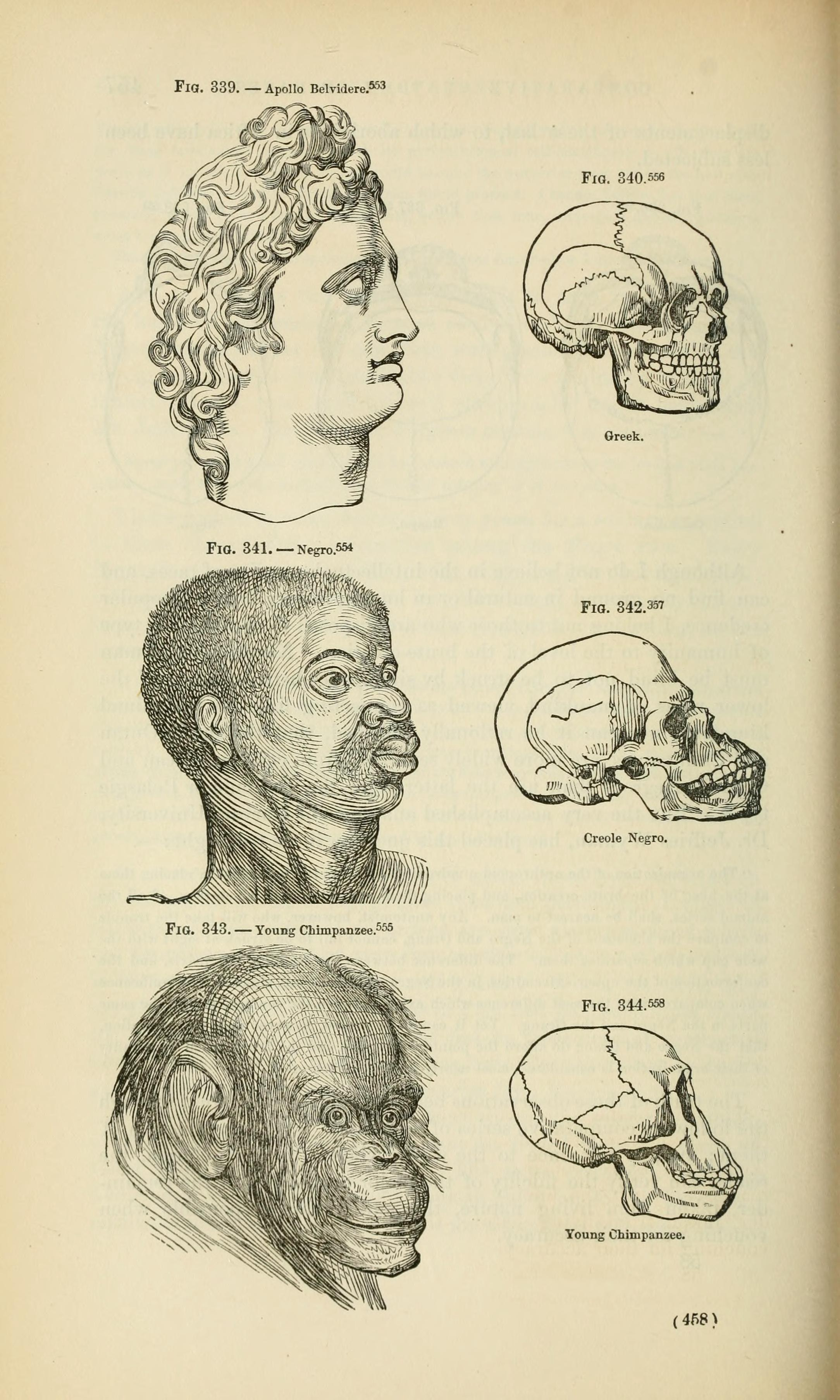
Illustration from Indigenous Races of the Earth (1857), whose authors Nott and George Gliddon implied that "Negroes" were a creational rank between "Greeks" and chimpanzees

Nott took up the theory that malaria and yellow fever were caused by parasitic infections with "animalcules" (microorganisms), earlier held by John Crawford. In his 1850 Yellow Fever Contrasted with Bilious Fever he attacked the prevailing miasma theory.

He is often credited as being the first to apply the insect vector theory to yellow fever, then a serious health problem of the American South. However, unlike his contemporary Louis-Daniel Beauperthuy, he did not actually go so far as to suggest that mosquitos in fact spread the germs. In fact, he explicitly acknowledged that he did not know how the "animalculae might be communicated through the air or directly to individuals".

Nott lost four of his children to yellow fever in one week in September 1853.

Nott believed that mixed-race relationships between people of European and African descent would lead to the "probable extermination of the two races" because mulattoes would live shorter lives, be more susceptible to disease, and less fertile — but that more data was needed to prove the claim. Citing Nott's need, Kentucky Senator Joseph R. Underwood had the racial category of "mulatto" added to the 1850 United States census.

Morton's followers, particularly Nott and George Gliddon (1809–1857) in their monumental tribute to Morton's work, Types of Mankind (1854), carried Morton's ideas further and claimed and backed up his findings, which supported the notion of polygenism, which claims that humanity originates from different ancestral lineages and is the ancestor of the multiregional hypothesis.

In their book, Nott and Gliddon argued that the races of mankind each occupied distinct zoological provinces and did not originate from a single pair of ancestors; they both believed God had created each race and positioned each race in separate geographic provinces. The doctrine of zoological provinces outlined in Types of Mankind did not allow for "superiority" of one type of race over another; each type was suited to its own province, and was superior within its own province. At the same time, though, Nott concluded that "Caucasian races . . . are influenced by several causes in a greater degree than other races," including "the largest brains and the most powerful intellect." Similarly, Nott claimed that, because the races were created in different provinces, all races must be of equal antiquity. Here, however, Nott used "race" to signify something "pure and permanent," a distinct and specific "type" that faced "extermination" if "mixed" with another "type." Nott's concept of racial purity greatly informed the twentieth century racial theories employed by the Nazi regime. Moreover, Nott and other polygenists, such as Gliddon, believed that the name of the biblical Adam meant "to show red in the face" or "blusher" in Hebrew; since supposedly only light-skinned people could blush, the biblical Adam must have been of the Caucasian race.

Nott persistently attacked the scientific basis of the Bible and also rejected the theory of evolution by claiming that the environment does not change any organism into another, and also rejecting common descent. Nott believed monogenism was "absurd" and had no biblical or scientific basis. He pointed to excavations in Egypt that depicted animals and humans as they looked today to refute monogenism and evolution. According to Nott, the monuments and artifacts found in Egypt proved that the "White, Mongolian and Negro existed at least five thousand years ago." Nott claimed that this proved beyond dispute that each race had been created separately.

Nott claimed that the writers of the Bible had no knowledge of any races except themselves and their immediate neighbors and that it did not concern the whole of the earth's population. According to Nott, there were no verses in the Bible that support monogenism and that the only passage used by the monogenists, Acts 17:26, "And [he] hath made of one blood all nations of men for to dwell on all the face of the earth, and hath determined the times before appointed, and the bounds of their habitation;" was interpreted by them wrongly since the "one blood" of Paul's sermon included only the nations that he knew existed, which were local.

In 1856, Nott hired Henry Hotze to translate Arthur de Gobineau's An Essay on the Inequality of the Human Races (1853–55), a founding text of "biological racism" that contrasted with Boulainvilliers (1658–1722)'s theory of races, and Nott provided an appendix with his most recent results. Gobineau subsequently complained that Hotze's translation had ignored his comments on "American decay generally and slaveholding in particular".

In 1857, Nott and Gliddon again co-edited a book, Indigenous Races of the Earth. That book built upon the arguments in Types of Mankind that linked anthropology with "scientific" studies of race to establish a supposed natural hierarchy of the races. The book included chapters from Louis Ferdinand Alfred Maury, J. Atkin Meigs, and Francis Polszky, letters from Louis Agassiz, Joseph Leidy, and A.W. Habersham.

Charles Darwin opposed Nott and Gliddon's polygenist and creationist arguments in his 1871 The Descent of Man, arguing for a monogenism of the human species. Darwin conceived the common origin of all humans (aka single-origin hypothesis) as essential for evolutionary theory. Darwin cited Nott and Gliddon's arguments as an example of those classing the races of man as separate species; Darwin disagreed and he concluded that humanity is one species.

Nott was a founder of the Medical College of Alabama, established in Mobile in 1859, and served as its professor of surgery. In 1860 he successfully appealed to the state legislature for a monetary appropriation and a state charter for the school. During the American Civil War, he served as a Confederate surgeon and staff officer. During the early years of the war, he served as director of the Confederate General Army Hospital in Mobile; later, he served in the field as medical director on the staffs of Brig. Gen. Daniel Ruggles and Gen. Braxton Bragg, and as hospital inspector. He lost both of his remaining sons to the war. Upon his own death in 1873, he was interred at Magnolia Cemetery in Mobile.

== Honors ==
A building at the University of Alabama was named Nott Hall in honor of Nott for his work at the predecessor Medical College of Alabama. It attracted controversy in 2016, with several student groups petitioning the building to be renamed or an educational plaque to be added because of Nott's open racism even by the standards of his era. On August 5, 2020, his name was removed from the building, which was renamed Honors Hall.

== Evolving views on race of the Egyptians ==
While originally believing that the Egyptians were purely Caucasian, the authors of Types of Mankind (1854) modified their views based on excavations from earlier dynasties. In their view, the earliest Egyptians were neither Caucasian or Negro but an intermediate Negroid type. However, they still believed that pure Negroes existed in Egypt only as slaves:

"But, while it must be conceded that Negroes, at no time within the reach even of monumental history, have inhabited any of Egypt, save as captives; it may, on the other hand, be equally true, that the ancient Egyptians did present a type intermediate between other African and Asiatic races; and, should such be proved to have been the case, the autocthones of Egypt must cease to be designated by the misnomer of "Caucasian."

Specifically, in 1854, Nott and George R. Gliddon noted that according to majority of ethnographers and Samuel George Morton's own anthropological works, "the Fellahs of Upper and Middle Egypt, at the present day, continue to be an unmistakable race, and are regarded by most travelled authorities as the best living representatives of the ancient population of Egypt." They would also take the position that, "the iconographic monuments of the IVth, Vth, and VIth dynasties, is closely analogous to the predominant type of that day; which fact serves to strengthen our view that the Egyptians of the early dynasties were rather of an African or Negroid type-resembling the Bishari in some respects, and in others the modern Fellah, or peasantry of Upper Egypt."

In the 19th century, the word "Negro" was intended to be only used for people who displayed the highest degree of stereotypical black African characteristics, with the suffix oid in "Negroid" making the word literally mean "Negro like". From the 1911 Encyclopædia Britannica: "It is most convenient, however, to refer to the dark-skinned inhabitants of this zone by the collective term of Negroids, and to reserve the word Negro for the tribes which are considered to exhibit in the highest degree the characteristics taken as typical of the variety."

Samuel Morton addressed several letters to George Gliddon and stated that he modified many of his old views on ancient Egypt, believing their origins to be similar to Barabra populations, but not Negroes.

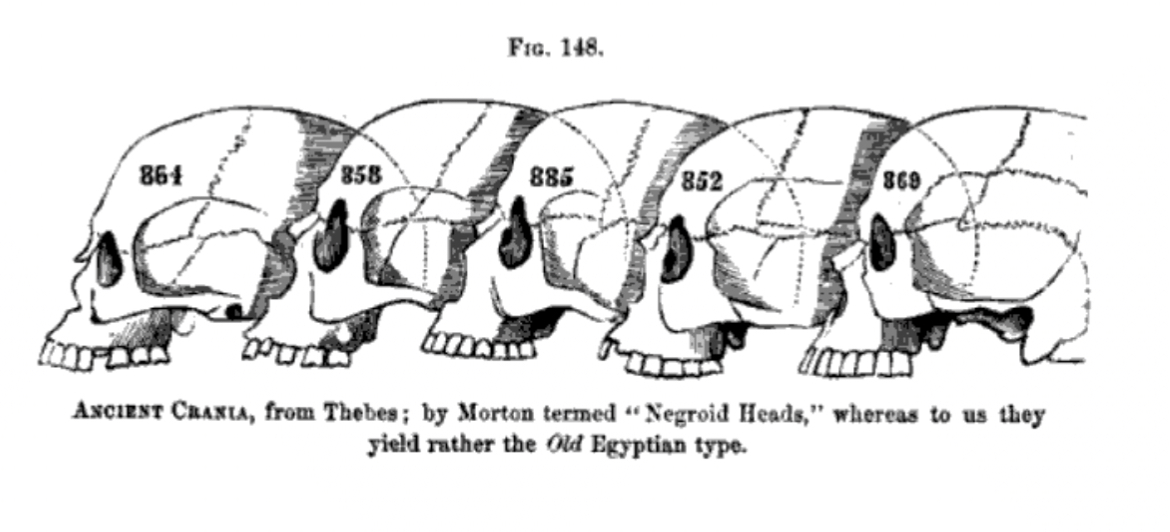
Figure 148 Types of Mankind P. 226

== Works ==
- Nott, Josiah Clark. Yellow Fever contrasted with Bilious Fever — Reasons for believing it is a disease sui generis — Its mode of Propagation — Remote Cause — Probable insect or animalcular origin, &c. New Orleans Medical and Surgical Journal, volume 4 (1848), pp. 563–601.
- Nott, Josiah Clark. Sketch of the Epidemic of Yellow Fever of 1847, in Mobile. The Charleston Medical Journal and Review, volume 1 (1848), pp. 1–21 Excerpt, PBS, The Great Fever.
- Nott, Josiah Clark. Two Lectures on the Connection between the Biblical and Physical History of Man, Delivered by Invitation, from the Chair of Political Economy, Etc., of the Louisiana University, in December, 1848. (1848)
- Nott, Josiah Clark. An Essay on the Natural History of Mankind, Viewed in Connection with Negro Slavery Delivered Before the Southern Rights Association, 14 December 1850. (1851)
- Nott, Josiah Clark, George R. Gliddon, Samuel George Morton, Louis Agassiz, William Usher, and Henry S. Patterson. Types of Mankind: Or, Ethnological Researches : Based Upon the Ancient Monuments, Paintings, Sculptures, and Crania of Races, and Upon Their Natural, Geographical, Philological and Biblical History, Illustrated by Selections from the Inedited Papers of Samuel George Morton and by Additional Contributions from L. Agassiz, W. Usher, and H.S. Patterson. (1854)
- Nott, Josiah Clark, George Robins Gliddon, and Louis Ferdinand Alfred Maury. Indigenous Races of the Earth; Or, New Chapters of Ethnological Inquiry; Including Monographs on Special Departments. (1857)

== See also ==
- Scientific racism
- Craniometry
