= John Rogers (died 1636) =

English Puritan clergyman and preacher

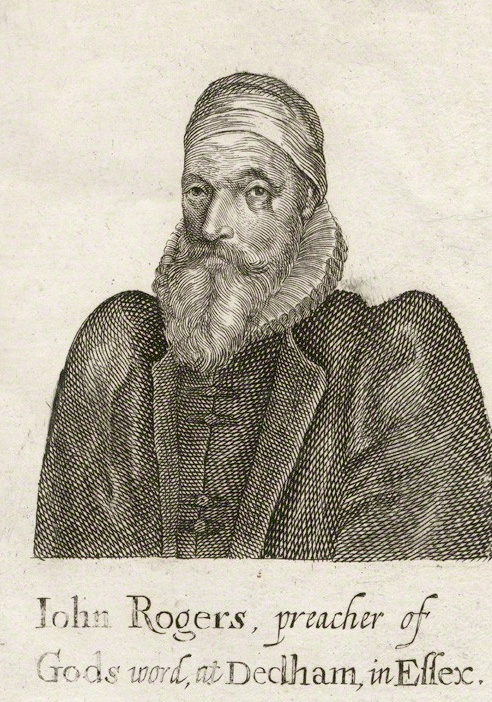
John Rogers.

John Rogers (c. 1570 – 1636) was an English Puritan clergyman and preacher. Described as a "grave and judicious divine" and considered one of the most awakened preachers of his era, according to the book, Lives of The Puritans.

== Life ==
His parents were John Rogers (died 1601), a shoemaker from Moulsham in Essex, and his wife, Mary (died 1579). Richard Rogers, his uncle, provided for his education at Emmanuel College, Cambridge. On two separate occasions John Rogers sold his books as he was "so addicted to vice", if not for the persuasion of Richard Rogers wife, John Rogers may have been cast off totally. Despite his early mistakes John Rogers became "an illustrious ornament" to his college and was of the most "exemplary piety". It appears he graduated in 1591/2. In 1592 he became vicar of Honingham, Norfolk, and in 1603 he succeeded Lawrence Fairclough, father of Samuel Fairclough, as vicar of Haverhill, Suffolk.

In 1605 he became lecturer, not vicar as some scholars believe, of Dedham, Essex, where for over thirty years he had the repute of being "one of the most awakening preachers of the age." The vicars and lecturers are listed inside the church by the north door. On his lecture days his church overflowed. On one occasion, according to John Howe based on a report by Thomas Goodwin, Rogers rebuked the congregation for their woeful neglect of the Bible. His eloquence, some would say anointed preaching, moved many to tears and loud weeping. On market days he preached to hundreds of people from the tower by the muniment room above the north porch. This muniment room holds some early editions of his works.

One of his admirers was to have said of him, "Come, let us go to Dedham, and get a little fire." Cotton Mather reports a saying of Ralph Brownrig that Rogers would "do more good with his wild notes than we with our set music." His lecture was suppressed from 1629 till 1631, on the ground of his nonconformity. His subsequent compliance was not strict. Giles Firmin, one of his converts, never saw him wear a surplice, and he only occasionally used the prayer-book, and then repeated portions of it from memory.

He died on 18 October 1636, and was buried in the churchyard at Dedham. There is a tombstone to his memory, and also a mural monument in the church on the north wall of the sanctuary. His funeral sermon was preached by John Knowles. His engraved portrait exhibits a worn face, and depicts him in nightcap, ruff, and full beard. Matthew Newcomen succeeded him at Dedham. Nathaniel Rogers was his second son.

== Works ==
He published:

- The Doctrine of Faith, 1627; 6th edit. 1634, 12mo.
- A Treatise of Love, 1629; 3rd edit. 1637.
- Posthumous was A Godly and Fruitful Exposition upon ... the First Epistle of Peter, 1650 .

Benjamin Brook assigns to him, without date, Sixty Memorials of a Godly Life. He prefaced Gods Treasurie displayed, 1630, by F. B. (Francis Bunny? [Early English Books Online lists the author as Bridges, Francis, fl. 1630]).

== Notes ==
Attribution

This article incorporates text from a publication now in the public domain: "Rogers, John (1572?-1636)". Dictionary of National Biography. London: Smith, Elder & Co. 1885–1900.
