= Monogenism =

Theory which posits a common descent for all humans

Monogenism or sometimes monogenesis is the theory of human origins which posits a common descent for all humans. The negation of monogenism is polygenism. This issue was hotly debated in the Western world in the nineteenth century, as the assumptions of scientific racism came under scrutiny both from religious groups and in the light of developments in the life sciences and human science. It was integral to the early conceptions of ethnology.

Modern scientific views favor this theory, with the most widely accepted model for human origins being the "Out of Africa" theory.

== In the Abrahamic religions ==
The belief that all humans are descended from Adam is central to traditional Judaism, Christianity and Islam. Christian monogenism played an important role in the development of an African-American literature on race, linked to theology rather than science, up to the time of Martin Delany and his Principia of Ethnology (1879). Scriptural ethnology is a term applied to debate and research on the biblical accounts, both of the early patriarchs and migration after Noah's Flood, to explain the diverse peoples of the world. Monogenism as a Bible-based theory required both the completeness of the narratives and the fullness of their power of explanation. These time-honored debates were sharpened by the rise of polygenist skeptical claims; when Louis Agassiz set out his polygenist views in 1847, they were opposed on biblical grounds by John Bachman, and by Thomas Smyth in his Unity of the Human Races. The debates also saw the participation of Delany, and George Washington Williams defended monogenesis as the starting point of his pioneer history of African-Americans.

== Environmentalist monogenism ==
Environmentalist monogenism describes a theory current in the first half of the nineteenth century, in particular, according to which there was a single human origin, but that subsequent migration of groups of humans had subjected them to different environmental conditions.

Environmentalism in this sense was found in the writings of Samuel Stanhope Smith. The theory stated that perceived differences, such as human skin color, were, therefore, products of history. A proponent of this approach to monogenism was James Cowles Prichard. It was discussed in the context of the knowledge of the time of historical linguistics.

Prichard died in 1848; in 1850 Robert Knox published his The Races of Men, arguing the intrinsic physical and mental characteristics of races. This work was a major influence to the anti-environmentalist and polygenist case on race and origins. In The Effect of Circumstances upon the Physical Man (1854) Frederick Douglass argued for an environmentalist monogenism, following Prichard, Bachman, and Robert Gordon Latham, but also in the tradition of Hosea Easton and James McCune Smith. For Douglass, monogenesis was closely related to egalitarianism and his politics of black humanity.

== Monogenism under attack in France ==
In France of the 1850s, monogenism was an unfashionable point of view. Polygenism was supported by physicians, anthropologists, taxonomists and zoologists; and the biblical associations of monogenism held against it in scientific circles. Paul Topinard, an early physical anthropologist, associated monogenism with backwardness and narrow intellectual horizons. Jean Louis Armand de Quatrefages de Bréau was a major French voice for monogenism of the period. The debate became entrenched with that on freethought.

== Mid-century contention in the United Kingdom ==
Around 1850 polygenism was a rising intellectual trend. On the other hand, monogenism retained support in London's learned societies. The Ethnological Society of London had the monogenist tradition of Thomas Hodgkin and James Cowles Prichard, continuing in Robert Gordon Latham. Others on that side of the debate were William Benjamin Carpenter, Charles Darwin, Edward Forbes, Henry Holland, Charles Lyell, and Richard Owen. The direction of the Ethnological Society was challenged by James Hunt, a polygenist who became a secretary in 1859, and John Crawfurd, who was president two years later, who believed in a large number of separately created racial groups.

In the face of advocates of polygenism, monogenism received a second wind after the recognition of the antiquity of man, and the almost simultaneous publication of Darwin's theory of evolution. Once the biblical timescale of 6000 years was dropped, the objections to environmentalist monogenism were weakened, since the "unity and migration" hypothesis of the origins of human diversity could operate over tens of thousands of years. Since polygenists such as Hunt and Crawfurd were opponents of Darwin, monogenism became part of a larger debate on evolution.

== Biology, specific unity, and varieties of man ==
Polygenism, in its biological form, asserted that different races corresponded to different species. Monogenism, therefore, attracted interest to the biological assertion of "specific unity", or single species theory of humankind. An argument brought against monogenism in its environmentalist form was that it involved a Lamarckian hypothesis on inheritance. This debating point was used, for example, by Agassiz. James Lawrence Cabell argued that reference to Lamarck was irrelevant to determining whether specific unity was a scientific fact. Cabell's view was of common creation of humankind, which had "permanent varieties" in the form of races.

Augustus Henry Keane in 1896 wrote of:

[...] two assumptions, both strenuously denied by many ethnologists, firstly, that the Hominidæ descend from a single precursor, secondly, that their differences are comparatively slight, or not sufficiently pronounced to be regarded as specific.

These assumptions, Keane argued, would justify putting race on the same footing as the botanical concept of variety. He described his own views as "unorthodox monogenesis". Monogenism was compatible with racial discrimination, via the argument on disposition to accept "civilization".

== Interfertility and biological unity ==
The interfertility of human races was debated, applying to human speciation arguments advanced already by Georges-Louis Leclerc, Comte de Buffon. The criterion of interfertility for a single human species was not universally accepted, being rejected, for example, by Samuel George Morton.

Charles Darwin regarded the evidence of interfertility as conclusive and substantiating the biological unity of humankind. He rejected claims of Paul Broca concerning the lack of fertility of unions of European settlers and Aboriginal Australians, and relied on data of John Bachman of the fertility of mulatto (mixed race) persons. On the other hand, Darwin's theory admitted the idea of "varieties of man": it was neither purely monogenist (in the sense of the term previously used), nor polygenist.

== Modern scientific views ==
In modern times, the scientific community widely favours monogenism due to evidence that shows modern humans share a common evolutionary origin in Africa.

== See also ==
- Linguistic monogenesis and polygenesis
- Intelligent design
