= Sara Bulkley Rogers =

- Born: April 12, 1864; Waterbury
- Died: February 3, 1907 (aged 42); Bridgeport
- Alma mater: Yale University
- Occupation: Writer
- Relatives: Cornelia Hephzibah Bulkley Rogers

Sara Bulkley Rogers (April 12, 1864 – February 3, 1907) was an American novelist and short story writer. She was one of the first seven women to receive a doctorate from Yale University, earning her PhD in history in 1894.

Sara Bulkley Rogers was born on April 12, 1864, in Waterbury. Connecticut, the daughter of Samuel Towner Rogers and Cornelia Hephzibah Bulkley Rogers. Rogers graduated with a BA from Columbia University in 1889 from their Course of Collegiate Study for women, the forerunner of Barnard College. In 1891 she graduated with a MA from Cornell University. In 1894, she and her sister Cornelia Hephzibah Bulkley Rogers were among the first seven women to graduate with PhDs from Yale. Sara Rogers earned a doctorate in history with her dissertation The Rise of Civil Government and Federation in Early New England.

Rogers published short stories in the New-York Evening Post, the Commercial Advertiser, and other outlets. She published a novel, Life's Way (1897) under the name Schuyler Shelton and a short story collection, Ezra Hardman, M.A., of Wayback College, and Other Stories (1900) under her own name. Publishers Weekly called the latter volume, about a midwestern scholar struggling in eastern academia, "one of the best collections of college stories in recent years."

Sara B. Rogers died on 3 February 1907 in Bridgeport, Connecticut.

== Bibliography ==
- Life's Way. 1 vol. London: Bentley, 1897.
- Ezra Hardman, M.A., of Wayback College, and Other Stories. New York: Dodge, 1900
