= Sarah Rogers Haight =

American traveler and writer (1808–1881)

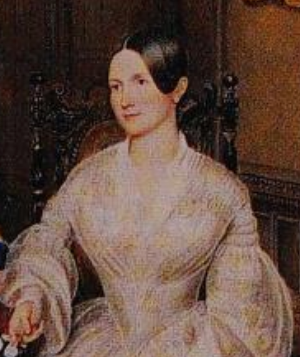
- Born: Sarah Rogers; 1808; New York City
- Died: 1881 (aged 72–73)
- Known for: Writer
- Notable work: From the Old World
- Spouse: Richard K. Haight

Sarah Rogers Haight (1808–1881) was an American traveler and writer from New York City who traveled to Europe, Asia, and Africa during a four-year Grand Tour. She wrote four books, the first of which identified the author as a "lady of New York" entitled A medley of joy and grief. Another book by her was published in 1925.

Two books, published in 1840 and 1846, were written about her travels, based on letters she had sent to a friend about her experiences. A fifth book, also based upon her correspondence, was published in 1953 by Susan B. Huntington called The Travels of Sarah R. Haight. Haight was identified as one of sixteen women who wrote with historical significance about Europe and the Near East between 1832 and 1859. Haight also wrote two musical arrangements and translated a French children's book into English.

Her husband Richard K. Haight was an international trader with an interest in ancient Egyptian history. He collected items from Egypt and other Middle Eastern countries. Richard met Egyptologist George Gliddon and funded lectures in the United States and study with eminent Egyptologists.

== Personal life, marriage, and death ==
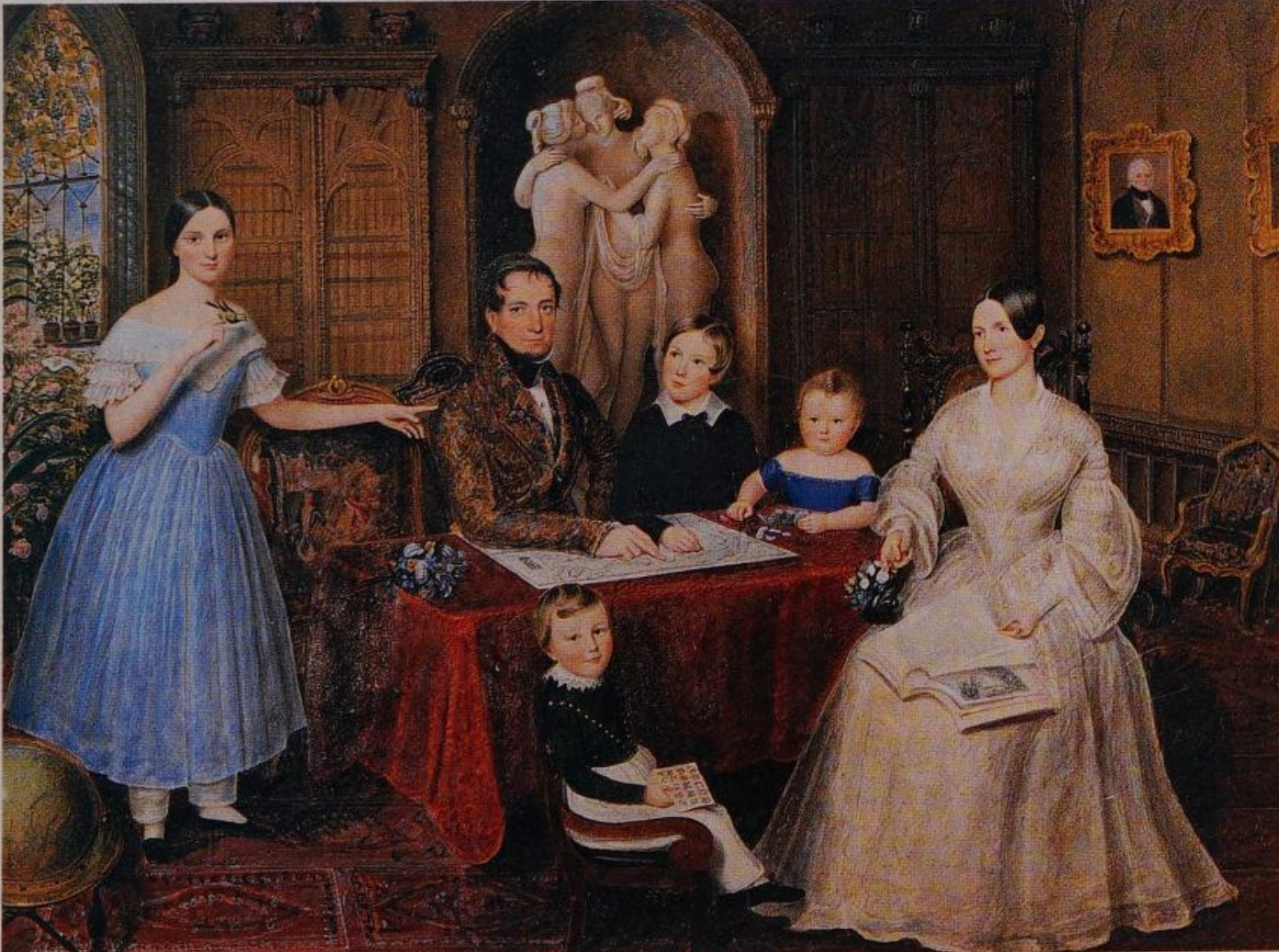
Sarah Rogers and Richard K. Haight family, 1842–1848, Museum of the City of New York, attributed to Nicolino Calyo. Their children in the painting were Lydia, Richard, David, and Frances. In the background is a marble copy of The Three Graces by Antonio Canova.

=== Early life ===
Sarah Rogers was born in New York City and received a good education.

=== Marriage and children ===
Sarah Rogers married Richard Kip Haight, also born and raised in New York City, becoming Sarah Rogers Haight. They were married on December 12, 1826, at the Setauket Presbyterian Church in Setauket, New York. Richard, born about 1797, was a wealthy international merchant. Haight was a "famous beauty and socialite".

The couple took a Grand Tour of Europe from 1835 to 1839 with a daughter, age 5, and a baby born in Geneva. Haight was pregnant on the journey to Europe. Haight and her husband went on an extended excursion throughout Europe, the Middle East, and Turkey over three years, leaving their baby and daughter in Paris with nannies, at great stress and anguish to Haight.

A portrait was made of the Haight family of six, a gouache attributed to Nicholino Calyo. Their children in 1842 were Lydia, Richard, David, and Frances. The family lived at 4 Lafayette Place in Manhattan, a fashionable neighborhood of row houses and parks laid out in 1826 by John Jacob Astor. About 1849, they moved to 5th Avenue and 15th Street into a new, refined Italianate mansion, its architecture of the "best buildings in Italy". (Note: Both mansions are no longer standing, per Google maps.) Among their art collection was Flora, sculpted by Thomas Crawford. In 1860, the Haights intended to donate the work to Central Park so that people of all classes could enjoy it.

Richard was a partner in a hat merchant business, first with his brother Henry, and by 1859, he was a partner of the importers Haight, Halsey & Company. He died on November 2, 1862, and was buried at the New York Marble Cemetery. Haight died in 1881, before August 3.

=== Ancestors ===
Haight descended from the Puritan immigrant Nathaniel Rogers and his great-grandfather, English martyr John Rogers, who was burned at the stake in 1555 at Smithfield, London, England. On her mother's side of the family, she descended from Richard Smith, for whom Smithtown, New York was named.

== From the Old World ==
Haight traveled to most of Europe, as well as Africa and Asia, and lived in foreign capital cities. She traveled with a French cook and visited oriental courts, slave markets, harems, and the pyramids. When she traveled to a city that she had not been to before, Haight went to a tall place, like a tower, to view the city so that she could see prominent landmarks, have a "birds eye view" of the layout of the city, and have a sense of its location.

=== Correspondence publication ===
Haight wrote letters to a friend, who saved them, and they were shared in her book, Woman's Record, Or, Sketches of All Distinguished Women: From the Creation to A.D. 1854 : Arranged in Four Eras : with Selections from Female Writers of Every Age (From the Old World). Published in two volumes in 1840, it told of the learned men that she met, her friends and associates, and the places she explored, like museums and libraries. Her experiences traveling the Mediterranean were published by newspapers.

Haight is considered to be one of sixteen women who wrote about Europe and the Near East between 1832 and 1859 with historical significance. Mary Suzanne Schriber wrote a book about 19th-century American women who wrote about their travel abroad, "Telling Travels: Selected Writings by Nineteenth-Century American Women Abroad". It was a means for women to provide their opinions on international issues. The book Annali d'italianistica states that the 16 women that Schriber selected for her book, there is a commonality, "an attitude of delight in being away, an almost mischievous sense of freedom from the ordinary, the expected." During that time, Holy Land travel books had become popular, and as a woman, Haight was able to visit and write about places not accessible to men, like harems.

Haight wrote of her travels,

To Tartary's desert plains, from fertile Gallic lands,
From Norway's rocky coasts, to Nubia's burning sands,
We've wandered.
On Briton's Druid stones, Scythia's mounds on eastern plains,
Odin's temples in the North, o'er Memnon's cavern'd fanes
We've ponder'd.
The Gaul, Goth, and Saxon, Scandinavian and Hun,
Greek, Turcoman, Arab, and Nubia's swarthy son,
We've confronted.

Sarah Rogers Haight, From the Old World

=== Experiences ===
In the 1830s, Haight traveled to the Middle East. (Note: The Heights went to Egypt and then Beirut in 1836, where they met Jasper Chasseaud, an American consul, who traveled extensively throughout the East with Luther Bradish.) She said of the Holy Land, "actually treading on the soil of Palestine... all my historical recollections, sacred and profane, came fresh to my memory. She also said that she saw "in every face a patriarch, and in every ... chieftain an apostle." Like other American visitors, she had an idealized view of the Holy Land and was dismayed by the poverty, cruelty towards women, and lackluster architecture. Haight expressed that the Middle East region would do well to model itself after the United States and utilize missionaries, teachers, statesmen, and engineers to improve the "heathen land". (Note: Author, politician, and diplomat Michael Oren states that Americans who visited the Middle East and saw its peoples as corrupt and cruel and the United States as an exemplary nation, had not considered the cruelty and corruption that the United States inflicted when they displaced Native Americans during westward expansion, enslaved Black people, and committed corruptive practices like Tammany Hall had in New York City.) Haight believed that Jews would establish a homeland in Palestine and would rebuild and worship in ancient temples.

== Richard K. Haight ==
=== Collections ===
Richard first traveled to European countries in 1821, before he was married. He was particularly interested in ancient Egypt and he collected items that added to the understanding of the monuments along the Nile and Egypt. Ippolito Rosellini was a leader of the Franco-Tuscan expedition in 1828. Richard acquired one of three publications of I Monument dell'Egitto e della Nubia that Rosellini wrote about the expedition. He collected items from other countries, like vases from Greece.

=== Support George Gliddon's lectures and more ===
Richard sponsored lectures by George R. Gliddon, who had been an American consular agent in Cairo, to spread knowledge about ancient Egypt in cities along the east coast of the United States. He also supported Gliddon as he studied with Egyptoligists in Europe. Richard joined the Egyptian Society of Cairo after informed about it by Gliddon.

== Legacy ==
- Philip Hone, a mayor of New York City (1826–1827), said of her, "I have taken a liking to this lady. She is conceited but, in truth, she has much cause of it".

== Publications ==
Books

- A lady of New York (Sarah Rogers Haight) (1822). A medley of joy and grief; being a selection of original pieces in prose and verse, chiefly on religious subjects. New York: W. B. Gilley.
- Haight, Sarah Rogers (1825). Changing Scenes Containing a Description of Men and Manners of the Present Day, with Humourous [sic] Details of the Knickerbockers in Two Volumes. author.
- Haight, Sarah Rogers (1840). Letters from the Old World. Vol. 1 of 2. New York: Harper & Brothers.
- Haight, Sarah Rogers (1846). Over the Ocean: Or Glimpses of Travel in Many Lands. Paine & Burgess.
- Haight, Sarah Rogers; Huntington, Susan B. (1953). The Travels of Sarah R. Haight Through Switzerland, Austria-Hungary, Bohemia, Bavaria, Prussia, Holland, Denmark, Norway, Sweden, Finland, and Russia As Published in the New York American, 1839–1840.

Translator of a children's book

- A lady of New York, (Sarah Rogers Haight) (1841). Jane Brush and Her Cow: A Story for Children Illustrative of Natural History. New York: M. W. Dodd. Translated from a French book written by Mlle. Sophie Ulliac-Tremadeure.

Musical scores

- Haight, Sarah Rogers, The flower waltzes : as performed by Kendall's Band, New York: Hewitt & Jaques, OCLC 887014910
- Haight, Sarah Rogers, The Somnambula galop, New York: Hewitt & Jaques, OCLC 887014922

== Bibliography ==
- Oren, Michael B. (2007). Power, Faith and Fantasy. New York and London: W. W. Norton & Company. ISBN 978-0-393-05826-0.
