= Wahinda =

Ethnic group

The Wahinda are a clan or class (better than a tribe) of Eastern Africa, especially Uganda, Tanzania, Rwanda and Burundi, where they had a ruling role among different tribes.

They originated from the North as shown by their physical aspect

The Wahinda believed the drum was so holy that seeing one of them would be fatal to any person other than the sultan.

The late Sam Magara, a Ugandan military leader, was from the Muhinda clan of the Bahima.
