= Giles Firmin =

British doctor and minister

Giles Firmin (1614–1697) was an English Congregational minister and physician, deacon in the first church in Massachusetts of John Cotton, and ejected minister in 1662.

== Life ==
The son of Giles Firmin, he was born at Ipswich. As a schoolboy he was impressed by the preaching of John Rogers at Dedham, Essex. He matriculated at Emmanuel College, Cambridge, in December 1629, his tutor being Thomas Hill. At Cambridge he studied medicine.

In 1632 he went with his father to New England. While at Boston, Massachusetts, he was ordained deacon of the first church, of which John Cotton was minister. At Ipswich, Massachusetts, he received in 1638 a grant of 120 acres (0.49 km^{2}) of land. He practised medicine in New England, and was reputed a good anatomist.

By Christmas 1639 he was married to Susan Ward, daughter of Rev. Nathaniel Ward, pastor of the church at Ipswich.

About 1647 he returned to England, leaving wife and family in America; on the way he was shipwrecked on the coast of Spain. In 1648 Firmin was appointed to the vicarage of Shalford, Essex, which had been vacant a year since the removal of Ralph Hilles to Pattiswick. At Shalford he was ordained a presbyter by Stephen Marshall and others.

A royalist in principle, he prayed for the afflicted royal family. He got into controversy on points of discipline. He was a strong advocate for the parochial system, insisted on imposition of hands as requisite for the validity of ordination, and denied the right of parents who would not submit to discipline to claim baptism for their children. With Richard Baxter he opened a correspondence in 1654, complaining to him about separatists. The Quakers also troubled his parish. In church politics he followed Baxter, preferring a reformed episcopacy to either the Presbyterian or the Congregational model, but laying most stress on the need of a well-ordered parish. He actively promoted in 1657 the "agreement of the associated ministers of Essex" on Baxter's Worcestershire model.

After the Restoration he wrote to Baxter (14 November 1660) that he is most troubled about forms of prayer; these, he says, "will not downe in our parts." He is ready to submit to bishops,"so they will not force me to owne their power as being of divine authoritie," and adds, "some episcopacies I owne." In spite of the persuasive efforts of his seven children he refused to conform. As the result of his ejection (1662), Shalford Church was closed for some months.

Firmin retired to Ridgewell, Essex, perhaps on the passing of the Five Mile Act (1665). He supported himself by medical practice; the neighbouring justices took care that he should not be molested, though he regularly held conventicles. Once a month, when there was a sermon at Ridgewell Church he attended. On 22 July 1672 Daniel Ray, who had been ejected from Ridgewell, took out licences qualifying him to use his house as a presbyterian meeting-place. Firmin on 1 December took out similar licences. Ray moved away in 1673, and Firmin remained till his death in sole charge of the congregation.

Firmin retained robust health as an octogenarian, and took part in polemics. He had disagreed with Baxter in 1670, and in 1693 he entered the controversy over the reprinted works of Tobias Crisp. He was taken ill on a Sunday night after preaching, and died on the following Saturday, in April 1697.

His works include:

- A Serious Question Stated, &c., 1651 (on infant baptism).
- Separation Examined, &c., 1651 [i.e. 15 March 1652].
- Stablishing against Shaking, &c., 1656, 4to (against the quakers; the running title is Stablishing against Quaking; answered by Edward Burrough.
- Tythes Vindicated, &c., 1659.
- Presbyterial Ordination Vindicated, &c., 1660.
- The Liturgical Considerator Considered, &c., 1661, (anon., in answer to John Gauden).
- The Real Christian, &c., 1670, (in this he criticises Baxter).
- The Question between the Conformist and the Nonconformist, &c., 1681.
- Πανουργία, &c., 1693 (against Richard Davis and the works of Tobias Crisp).
- Some Remarks upon the Anabaptist's Answer to the Athenian Mercuries, &c. (1694), (apparently his last piece).

He wrote also in defence of some of the above, and in opposition to John Owen, Daniel Cawdry, Thomas Grantham, and others.
