= Barabra =

Old ethnographical term for the Nubian peoples

Barabra is a term for the Nubian peoples of northern Sudan and southern Egypt. The word is originally derived from the Greek word bárbaros (i.e. Barbarian) that was deformed to "barbarus" in Roman. It was originally used by Greeks to describe all foreigners (non Greek people). In addition, the word barabra is used in Arabic in the plural form "برابرة", hence the added 'a' between the 'r' and 'b' in 'Barabra'. When the locals use it in singular form to refer to one individual, they use the word "بربري" (in English transliteration "barbari"), an Arabized form of the Roman word "barbarus"; the ending letter 'ي' in Arabic or 'i' in English transliteration has the effect of transforming the word into an adjective, just as "مصر" (Masr) refers to Egypt as a country, while one says 'مصري' (Masri) to refer to an Egyptian individual.

The word barbarus was originally used to describe many other foreign non-Greek nations, including ancient Egyptians, Persians, Medes and Phoenicians, while the term egyptiote was used to describe Greeks living in Egypt.

In the 19th century Turco-Egyptian census takers used the term to describe the inhabitants between the 1st and 5th Nile cataracts, which included various Nubian and Arabic-speaking groups alike.

== See also ==
- ar:برابرة
- Barbaria
- Barbarian
