= Herman Bernhard Lundborg =

Swedish physician (1868–1943)

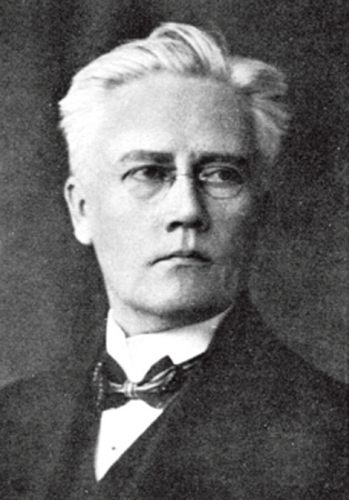
- Born: April 7, 1868; Väse, Sweden
- Died: May 9, 1943 (aged 75); Östhammar, Sweden
- Education: Karolinska Institutet; Uppsala University
- Medical career
- Field: psychiatry neurology race biology
- Institutions: State Institute of Racial Biology
- Research: racial hygiene

Herman Bernhard Lundborg (April 7, 1868 – May 9, 1943) was a Swedish physician and a race biologist.

== Biography ==
Lundborg was born in Väse, Sweden. He graduated in medicine at the Karolinska Institutet in 1895, and received his doctorate at the Uppsala University in 1903. He also habilitated there that year for psychiatry and neurology, and in 1915 for racial research and racial biology.

For his doctoral dissertation, Lundborg researched one of the genetic progressive myoclonus epilepsies first described by Heinrich Unverricht in 1891. Besides giving an account of the disease, he traced an affected family back to the 18th century, an analysis unique for that time. He concluded that the family had genetically degenerated because of "unwise marriages". The study has been described as "of considerable historic interest in human genetics". Over the years, the form of epilepsy became known as the Unverricht–Lundborg disease.

He was on the editorial board of the Hereditas journal, founded 1920, with the scope on genetics.

Lundborg was strongly involved with the ideology of racial hygiene. In the beginning of the 20th century, the idea that eugenics could improve the biological basis of society was widely held by academics and lawmakers, particularly in northern Europe and the United States. In 1922 Sweden established a eugenic governmental agency, the State Institute of Racial Biology, of which Lundborg was appointed as the head. Under his leadership, the institute began gathering copious statistics and photographs to map the racial make-up of about 100,000 Swedish people.

The Swedish writer Maja Hagerman has written a biography on Herman Lundborg and made a documentary about his racial research in Laponia.

He died in Östhammar.

== Race biologist ==
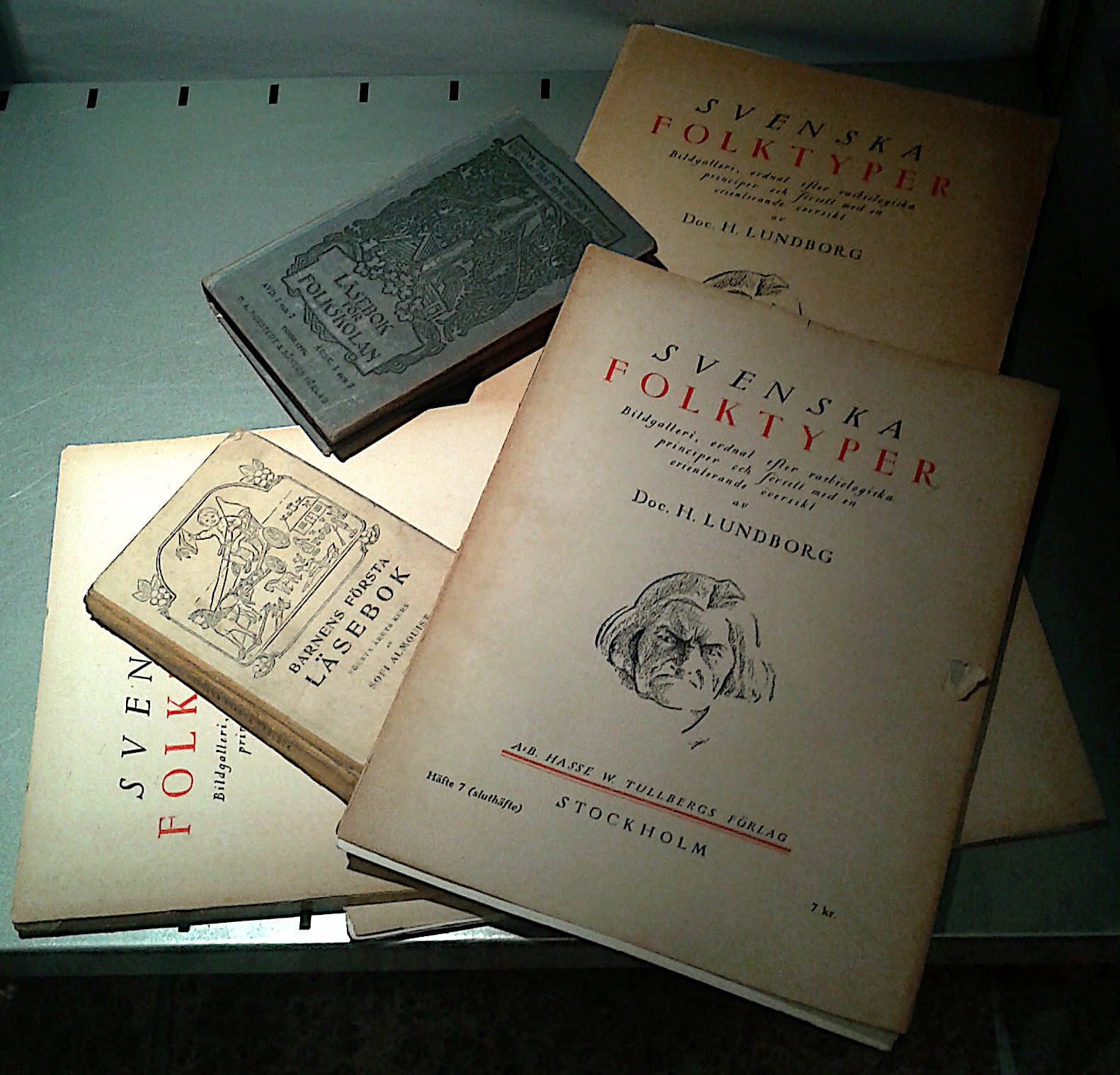
The pamphlet "Svenska Folktyper" by Herman Lundborg

One of Lundborg’s most widely read works in racial biology was a study of Swedish conscripts together with Frans Josua Linders, The racial characters of the Swedish nation (1926). This work was regarded as his most important contribution as a race theorist, for which he later became notorious. He also wrote popular science works on the subject, including Rasbiologi och rashygien (1914; Racial biology and racial hygiene), Svensk raskunskap (1927; Swedish racial science), and Västerlandet i fara (1934; The western world in danger). Several were translated into German and some into English. His racial ideal was the Swedish allmoge (peasantry) and its descendants. An important part of his theories was based on genealogy.

His research gained enormous impact and he attracted a large readership beyond the traditional academic discipline. In addition to writing, he travelled around with an exhibition about racial types and the characteristic appearances of different peoples, something that remained in public memory long after his death.

"Our small people, which about a thousand years ago numbered only a fraction of the country’s present population, has continually increased. A large part has emigrated to all possible countries in Europe and other parts of the world and there contributed to raising culture. The good race we have inherited from a generous nature has nowhere denied itself."

— Herman Lundborg, 27 October 1927

In March 1919, "The Swedish Folk Type Exhibition" opened at the Royal Swedish Academy of Fine Arts in Stockholm on Lundborg’s initiative and was compiled by Gaston Backman. The exhibition featured photographs of Swedes identified as belonging to the "nordic type", displayed alongside photographs of Sweden's national minorities namely, the Roma, and Sámi, as well as photographs of criminals and vagabonds. The exhibition, which was supported by figures including Sven Hedin, Anders Zorn, and Ellen Key, became a public success and toured around Sweden. On the Stockholm Exhibition 1930, Lundborg presented what he considered the latest findings on racial hygiene in the booth "Svea rike".

The belief that the Swedish race was degenerating and that there was racial material in the population that had to be combated resulted, among other things, in the establishment of the State Institute for Racial Biology in 1922 as well as the introduction of sterilization legislation in 1934. However, enthusiasm and support for Lundborg’s activities declined over time, and when Lundborg retired in 1935 he was succeeded by Gunnar Dahlberg, who significantly changed the institute’s focus toward research on hereditary diseases. Forced sterilization under the sterilization law was nevertheless carried out on an increasing scale until the mid-1950s, then declined before ending in 1976 when the sterilization law was abolished.

Lundborg praised Hitler, and his research colleagues in Germany were influential racial experts. He developed methods for racial examination that were later used in Nazi Germany. There he was regarded as a pioneer in racial biology and in 1936 was honored for his research with an honorary doctorate from Heidelberg University.

== Relatives and family ==
Lundborg was the son of Herman Emanuel Lundborg (1834–1888), chief engineer at the Swedish State Railways and major in the Road and Water Construction Corps, and Maria Vilhelmina Löhman. The family originates from Valbo parish in Gästrikland. The family name comes from the packing guild elder Erik Persson (1749–1819), born in the village of Alborga, active in the village of Lund and deceased in Gävle, who created the name after the villages he came from. Herman Lundborg had seven siblings, born in different places across the country due to their father's work in the railway industry. The eldest brother Axel became a bookkeeper at the railway board, and the three sisters Elma, Maria, and Nanna became teachers. The brother Hjalmar worked as a principal at the lower secondary school in Kramfors, and the younger brother Ragnar was an editor.

Herman Lundborg was first married from 1900 to the nurse Thyra Peterson (1868–1931) from Stockholm, and together they had two sons, Gunnar and Sune. His second marriage was entered into in 1936 with Maria Kristina (Maja) Holste (originally Isaksson) (1893–1968), who was of Tornedalian Finnish and Sámi descent and born in Soppero in Jukkasjärvi Parish. With her, Herman already had a son, Allan, in 1927. The paternity was formally acknowledged only in 1935.

== In the media ==
In the novel 'The Hundred-Year-Old Man Who Climbed Out of the Window and Disappeared' by the Swedish author Jonas Jonasson, Dr. Lundborg is mentioned in chapter 4.
