= State Institute for Racial Biology =

Defunct Swedish pseudoscientific research institute

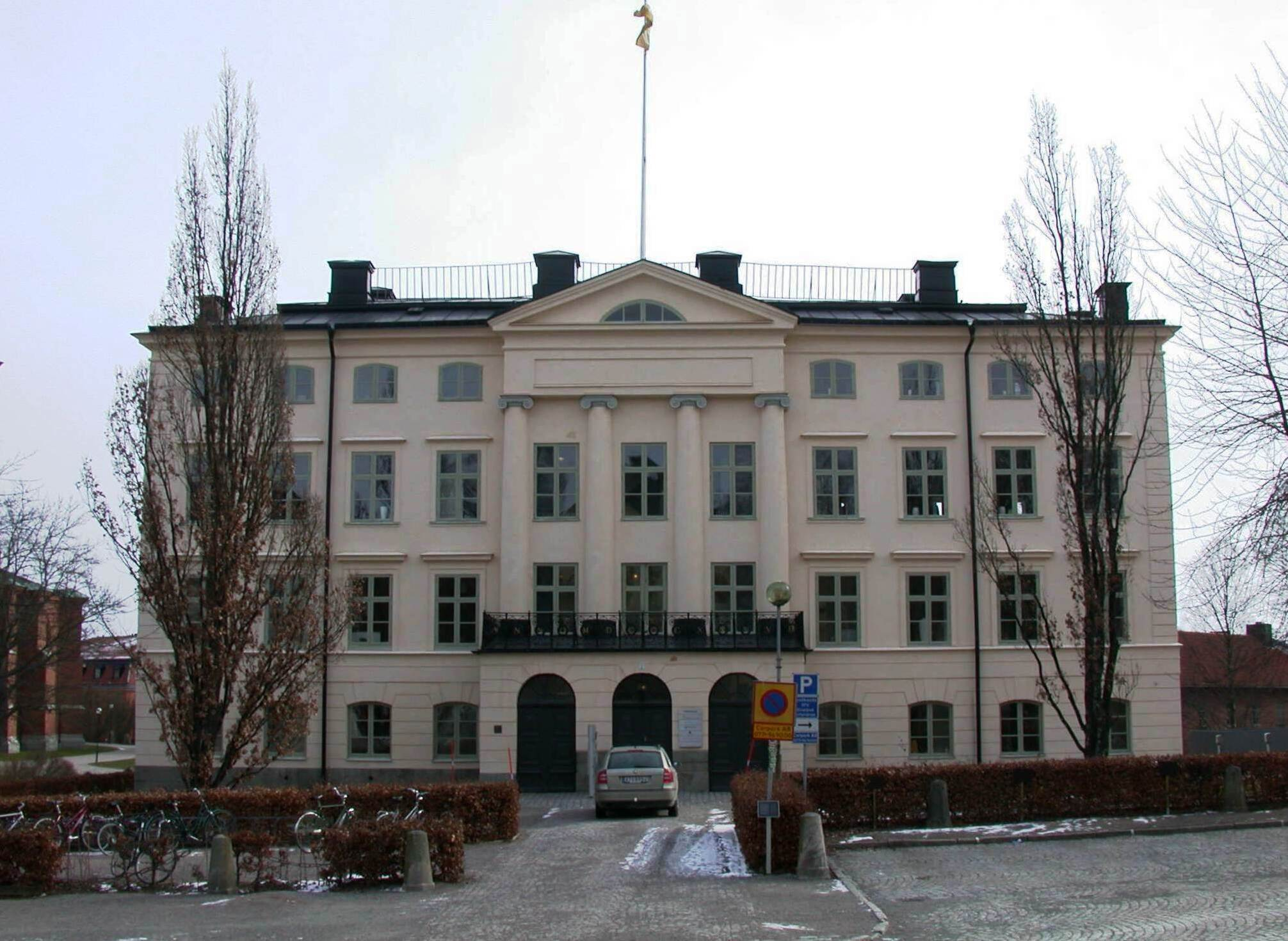
The Dekanhuset in Uppsala, where the institute was housed

The State Institute for Racial Biology (SIRB, Swedish: Statens institut för rasbiologi, SIFR) was a Swedish governmental research institute founded in 1922 with the stated purpose of studying eugenics and human genetics. It was the most prominent institution for the study of "racial science" in Sweden. It was located in Uppsala. In 1958, it was renamed to the State Institute for Human Genetics (Institutionen för medicinisk genetik) and is today incorporated as a department of Uppsala University.

The institute's first head was Herman Lundborg. He retired in 1935. He was succeeded by Gunnar Dahlberg. An early research priority was studying the commonness of the "Nordic" racial traits in the Swedish population and the alleged downsides of race-mixing between the majority population and Finns and the Sámi people. Between 1936 and 1960, the majority of research projects at SIRB concerned medical genetics but racial science was still an important aspect of the institute.

== History ==
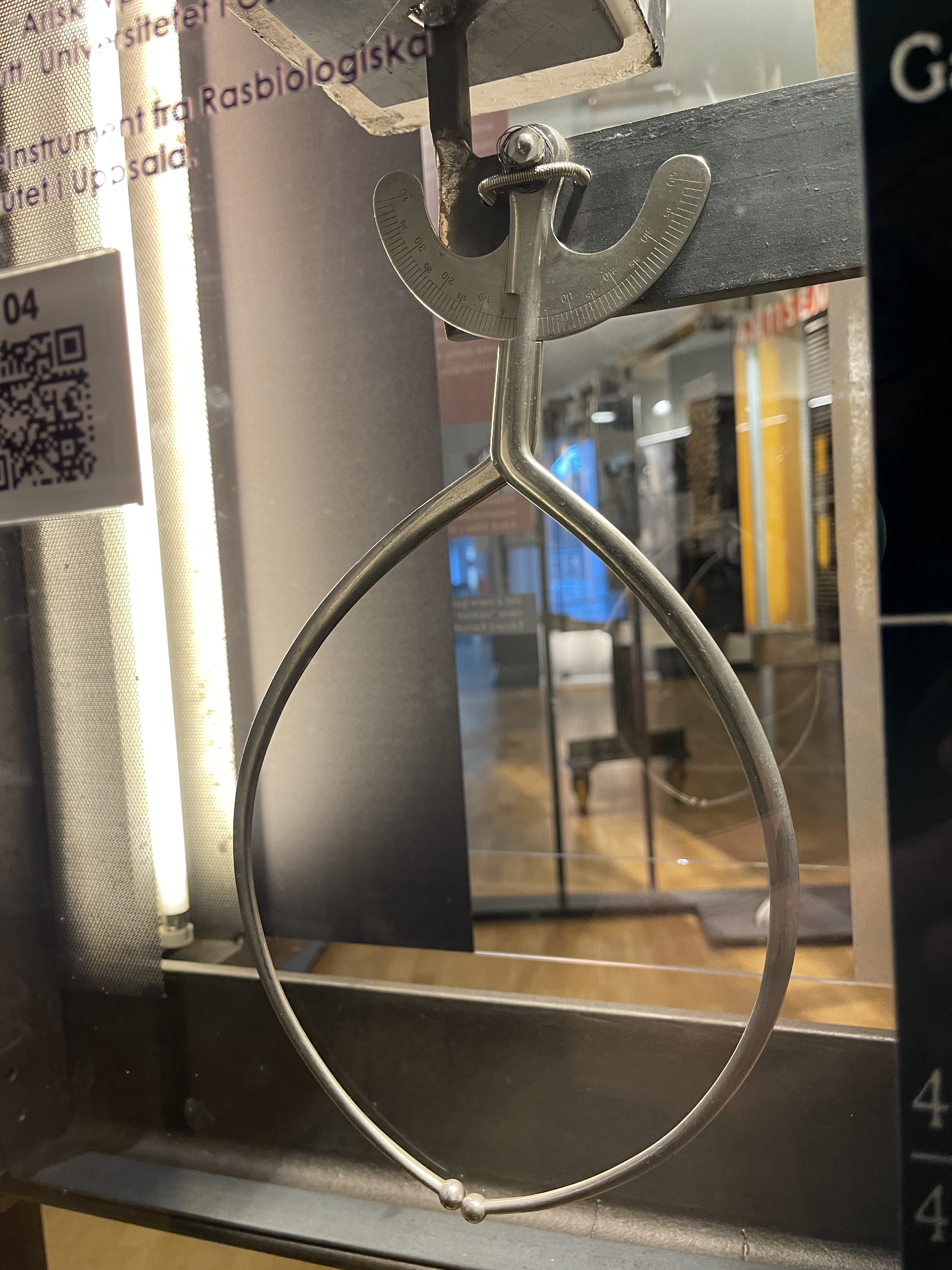
A handheld instrument for measuring human skulls, used by the State Institute for Racial Biology.

After its founding in 1922, it continued under the leadership of Herman Lundborg. In 1926, studies conducted by the institute provided a basis for Lundborg's upper secondary school textbook Swedish Racial Studies. However, Lundborg became increasingly antisemitic which put him at odds with the Swedish Government during a time when tensions were growing between Sweden and Germany. In 1936, he was replaced by Gunnar Dahlberg. In 1959 it was integrated into Uppsala University, and is today the university's genetic center.

The official assignment of the Swedish institute was to study the inhabitants of the country from a racial perspective. They studied the life conditions and environmental developments of different families in an attempt to explain the effects of biological heritage and the environment. They also studied mental illnesses, alcoholism and criminality.

Svenska sällskapet för rashygien (Swedish Society for Eugenics) was founded in 1909 and paved the way for SIRB. Its mission statement was to study eugenics. Svenska sällskapet för rashygien, and eugenics in general, did not gain ground until after World War I. In 1918 the society travelled around Sweden with an exhibit called Folktyputställning ('Exhibition on types of people'). The same year Frithiof Lennmalm, head of the Karolinska Institute, proposed that the Nobel Foundation finance an institute for race biology. The Nobel committee for medicine voted unanimously in favour of the proposal. The staff of the Karolinska Institute voted against it by a very thin margin (9 against 8). Instead it was proposed that the Swedish state found and finance such an institute.

== See also ==
- Kaiser Wilhelm Institute of Anthropology, Human Heredity, and Eugenics
