= Eugenics manifesto =

1939 eugenic-supporting article

Eugenics manifesto was the name given to an article rejecting eugenics, published in 1939 in the journal Nature, entitled Social Biology and Population Improvement.

In 2004, John Glad wrote that the document denounced Hitler's racism and the economic and political conditions that create antagonism between the races. "The Second World War had already begun, and the authors explicitly decried antagonism between races and theories according to which certain good or bad genes are the monopoly of certain peoples."

== Signatories ==
The 23 British and American men who signed the manifesto are listed below.

- Francis Albert Eley Crew
- Cyril Dean Darlington
- John Burdon Sanderson Haldane
- S. C. Harland
- Lancelot T. Hogben
- Julian S. Huxley
- Hermann Joseph Muller
- Joseph Needham
- G. P. Child
- P. R. David
- Gunnar Dahlberg
- Theodosius Dobzhansky
- Rollins Adams Emerson
- C. Gordon
- J. Hammond
- Charles Leonard Huskins
- Peo Charles Koller
- Walter Landauer
- Harold Henry Plough
- Bronson Price
- J. Schultz
- Arthur G. Steinberg
- Conrad Hal Waddington
