= Walter Landauer =

American geneticist

- Born: 15 July 1896; Mannheim
- Died: 1 February 1978 (aged 81); London
- Citizenship: United States
- Education: University of Heidelberg
- Scientific career
- Fields: animal genetics
- Workplaces: University of Connecticut

Walter Landauer (15 July 1896 – February 1978) was a German-American animal geneticist, who was interested particularly in chicken.

== Life ==
Walter Landauer was born 1896 in Mannheim, Germany, to S. Friedrich and Charlotte Ziegler Landauer. His father was a provincial court judge. He graduated with Abitur from the Reform-Gymnasium, Goethe School. In line with his pacifist ideals, he volunteered as a Red Cross nurse during WWI.

He studied zoology at the Goethe University Frankfurt and in 1922, he graduated from the University of Heidelberg. From 1922 to 1924 he studied under Curt Herbst, a scientist in the study of embryonic induction, investigating the effect of ammonia on the heredity of Echinoderm hybrids as Zoology Instructor at Heidelberg.

In 1924 he emigrated to the United States when Leslie Clarence Dunn offered him a 10-month position at the University of Connecticut at the Experiment Station. There he studied poultry defects, like rumplessness and chondrodystrophy in chicken embryos. He founded the department of animal genetics. From 1928 until his retirement, he was a professor in the department of animal genetics. In 1935 he signed the eugenics manifesto.

After his retirement in 1964, he relocated to London where he became honorary research associate in the department of Zoology and Comparative Anatomy at the University College in London.

Landauer was married to Naomi E. Beck (1939). He was naturalized in 1940. In 1964, he married Elly Trude Kiewe. He died in February 1978.

== Publications ==
- Landauer, Walter (2000). The Antecedents of Nazism, Weimar: The Political Papers of Walter Landauer. New Haven, CT: Connecticut Academy of Arts and Sciences. ISBN 1-878508-21-0. OCLC 45409928.
