= Gunnar Dahlberg =

Swedish physician (1893–1956)

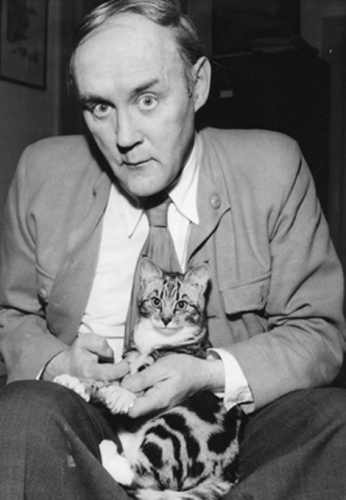
- Born: 1893
- Died: 1956 (aged 62–63)
- Scientific career
- Fields: eugenics genetics medicine
- Institutions: Statens institut för rasbiologi

Gunnar Dahlberg (1893–1956) was a Swedish physician, eugenist and geneticist.

From 1922 to 1924 he was the assistant of Herman Lundborg at Statens institut för rasbiologi. In 1935, when Lundborg retired, Dahlberg succeeded him as the head of the institute. Dahlberg held the post until his death in 1956 and was succeeded by the geneticist Jan Arvid Böök.

In September 1939, he was one of the signatories of the eugenics manifesto. In the 1950s, Gunnar Dahlberg gave his support to the UNESCO Statement on Race.

== Bibliography ==
- Dahlberg, Gunnar (1942). Race, reason and rubbish: an examination of the biological credentials of the Nazi Creed. London: George Allen & Unwin Ltd.
