= Väse =

- Location within Sweden
- Coordinates: 59°23′N 13°50′E
- Country: Sweden
- Province: Värmland
- County: Värmland County
- Municipality: Karlstad Municipality

Area
  - Total: 0.69 km^{2} (0.27 sq mi)

Population (31 December 2010)
  - Total: 494
  - Density: 715/km^{2} (1,850/sq mi)
- Time zone: UTC+1 (CET)
  - Summer (DST): UTC+2 (CEST)

Väse is a locality situated in Karlstad Municipality, Värmland County, Sweden with 494 inhabitants in 2010.
