= The IQ Controversy, the Media and Public Policy =

1988 book by Stanley Rothman and Mark Snyderman

- Cover of the 1988 printing of The IQ Controversy, the Media and Public Policy, published by Transaction Books
- Author: Mark Snyderman and Stanley Rothman
- Language: English
- Series: Center for the Study of Social and Political Change
- Subject: Intelligence levels, public opinion
- Publisher: Transaction Books
- Publication date: 1988
- Publication place: United States
- Media type: Print
- Pages: xiii and 310
- ISBN: 978-0-88738-839-2
- Dewey Decimal: 153.9
- LC Class: BF431.S615 1988

The IQ Controversy, the Media and Public Policy is a book published by Smith College professor emeritus Stanley Rothman and Harvard researcher Mark Snyderman in 1988. Claiming to document liberal bias in media coverage of scientific findings regarding intelligence quotient (IQ), the book builds on a survey of the opinions of hundreds of North American psychologists, sociologists and educationalists conducted by the authors in 1984. The book also includes an analysis of the reporting on intelligence testing by the press and television in the US for the period 1969–1983, as well as an opinion poll of 207 journalists and 86 science editors about IQ testing.

== Introduction ==
Snyderman and Rothman originally conducted their survey in 1984 because they felt that intelligence testing had been portrayed in the media as being in direct opposition to egalitarianism. They described the IQ controversy in terms of two conflicting sets of values in the US: egalitarianism, favouring equal opportunity, and meritocracy, favouring individual differences. In the 1960s, in the light of the civil rights movement, an environmental view of intelligence differences, de-emphasizing heritability, had become prevalent. In their view equality of opportunity had been transformed to mean equality of outcome, to the detriment of more able individuals. As they wrote:

The danger inherent in egalitarianism is that a philosophy of human rights may be extrapolated into a theory of human nature. That individuals should be treated equally does not mean that all individuals are equal. Whether as a result of accidents of birth and environment, or through strength of will, people differ in abilities of all sorts.

As a consequence, they wrote that attitudes to intelligence testing had changed:

Intelligence and aptitude tests have fallen into disfavor among the literate public, as have attempts to define intelligence. However intelligence is defined, the suggestion that individual differences in intelligence, like individual capacities for painting or composing, may have a genetic component has become anathema.

Snyderman and Rothman claimed that the media had misrepresented the views of experts, so that the public now believed that it was impossible to define intelligence, that IQ or aptitude tests were outmoded and that environmentalism and hereditarianism were incompatible points of view. As they wrote:

Most significantly, the literate and informed public today is persuaded that the majority of experts in the field believe it is impossible to adequately define intelligence, that intelligence tests do not measure anything that is relevant to life performance... It appears from book reviews in popular journals and from newspaper and television coverage of IQ issues that such are the views of the vast majority of experts who study questions of intelligence and intelligence testing.

The purpose of their survey was to challenge what they considered to be the media's portrayal of intelligence testing. Their study had three parts:

- A questionnaire with 48 multiple choice questions sent to 1020 academics in 1984 (661 replies), reported in Snyderman & Rothman (1987)
- An analysis of all coverage of issues related to intelligence tests in major US print and television news sources (1969–1983) conducted by 9 trained graduate students
- An opinion poll of 207 journalists concerning their attitudes to intelligence and aptitude tests (119 replies); 86 editors of popular science magazines were also polled (50 replies)

The 1020 experts were chosen randomly from the following professional bodies:

- American Educational Research Association (120)
- National Council on Measurement in Education (120)
- American Psychological Association:
  - Development psychology division (120)
  - Educational psychology division (120)
  - Evaluation and Measurement division (120)
  - School psychology division (120)
  - Counseling psychology division (60)
  - Industrial and organizational psychology division (60)
- Behavior Genetics Association (60)
- American Sociological Association (education) (60)
- Cognitive Science Society (60)

The 16 page questionnaire had 48 multiple choice questions spread over 6 different sections:

- The nature of intelligence (1-10)
- The heritability of intelligence (11-14)
- Race, class and cultural differences in IQ (15-23)
- The use of intelligence testing (24-33)
- Professional activities and involvement with intelligence testing (34-40)
- Personal and social background (41-48)

== Synopsis ==
Respondents on average identified themselves as slightly left of center politically, political and social opinions accounted for less than 10% of the variation in responses.

Snyderman and Rothman claimed that experts were in agreement about the nature of intelligence. "On the whole, scholars with any expertise in the area of intelligence and intelligence testing (defined very broadly) share a common view of the most important components of intelligence, and are convinced that it can be measured with some degree of accuracy." Almost all respondents picked out abstract reasoning, ability to solve problems and ability to acquire knowledge as the most important elements.

The study found that psychologists in the survey were in agreement about the heritability of intelligence in that almost all (94%) felt that it played a substantial role but there was disagreement regarding accuracy with half of those that felt qualified to reply in this section agreed that there was not enough evidence to estimate heritability accurately. The 214 who thought there was enough evidence gave an average estimate of .596 for the US white population and .57 for the US black population.

The study also revealed that the majority (55%) of surveyed experts believed that genetic factors also help to explain socioeconomic differences in IQ.

The role of genetics in the black-white IQ gap has been particularly controversial. The question regarding this in the survey asked "Which of the following best characterizes your opinion of the heritability of black-white differences in IQ?" Amongst the 661 returned questionnaires, 14% declined to answer the question, 24% said that there was insufficient evidence to give an answer, 1% said that the gap was "due entirely to genetic variation", 15% voted that it was "due entirely to environmental variation" and 45% said that it was a "product of genetic and environmental variation". According to Snyderman and Rothman, this contrasts greatly with the coverage of these views as represented in the media, where the reader is led to draw the conclusion that "only a few maverick 'experts' support the view that genetic variation plays a significant role in individual or group difference, while the vast majority of experts believe that such differences are purely the result of environmental factors."

In their analysis of the survey results, Snyderman and Rothman state that the experts who described themselves as agreeing with the "controversial" partial-genetic views of Arthur Jensen did so only on the understanding that their identity would remain unknown in the published report. This was due, claim the authors, to fears of suffering the same kind of castigation experienced by Jensen for publicly expressing views on the correlation between race and intelligence which are privately held in the wider academic community.

Snyderman and Rothman said that media reports often either reported that most experts believe that the genetic contribution to IQ is absolute (~100% heritability) or that most experts believe that genetics plays no role at all (~0% heritability). Snyderman and Rothman described this reporting as erroneous. As they wrote:

With the possible exception of Leon Kamin, we can be confident that none of the experts cited here actually believes that genes play no role in individual differences in IQ, but their positions are represented as such by newspapers that divide the world into hereditarians and environmentalists, and often fail to clarify for their readers that the argument is over the degree of genetic influence, not its existence or exclusive control. Because newspaper journalists either cannot or do not want to understand this distinction, readers will not either.

News reports also tended to cite the opinions of only very few experts, such as Arthur Jensen, Richard Herrnstein, and William Shockley, to whom they often attributed a variety of views, including that Blacks are 'inherently or innately inferior' to Whites, that their views have adverse implication for education policy or adverse political implications, or that they are racist. Snyderman and Rothman described this as a misattribution of views to these individuals, and speculated that it was fueled by the attacks made on them by public intellectuals, such as psychologist Leon Kamin.

The study also found that the media regularly presented the views of Kamin and evolutionary biologist Stephen Jay Gould as representative of mainstream opinion among experts, whereas those who publicly state that individual and group differences are partly genetic, in particular psychologist Arthur Jensen, were characterized as a small minority. Those experts surveyed by Snyderman and Rothman held theview. In particular, the surveyed experts reported that they hold the scientific views of Kamin to be of only marginal importance.

The survey found that IQ tests had been misused but that nevertheless most respondents strongly supported their continued use:

Our expert sample agrees that test misuse in elementary and secondary schools is prevalent...but they believe that test use should continue...It is also the case that almost half of all experts believe test misuse to be an infrequent phenomenon. Yet in all the news media coverage of test misuse, there is virtually no indication that misuse is not highly prevalent or that it does not completely invalidate test use.

Snyderman and Rothman suggested that the personal views and preferences of journalists and editors influenced their reporting, especially their selection of which views to present and how to present them. They suggested that the desire of the journalists and editors to advance liberal political goals, which are seen by many as incompatible with a substantial genetic contribution to individual and group differences in IQ, caused them to preferentially report the views of experts who reject the heritability of IQ.

== Related works ==
Rothman continued to refine explanations for bias in his later work. In Journalists, Broadcasters, Scientific Experts and Public Opinion (1990), he writes: "Since they lack the time to read many books or to think issues through carefully, [...] the judgements which journalists present to the public are often based on a very shallow knowledge of the subject with which they deal. They learn by reading newspapers and journals, and more important, obtain information from those they interview. They thus develop a superficial sophistication about various public issues."

A follow-up survey of intelligence experts was conducted in 2013 to study changes in expert opinion since the 1984 survey, and ask about topics which had emerged since then (e.g. the Flynn effect, cross-country differences in intelligence, validity of new genetic methods like GWAS and GCTA); the results were generally consistent with the original, supporting the validity of intelligence measurements and twin studies.

== Reception ==
The findings were welcomed by hereditarian researchers, such as Arthur Jensen, Hans Eysenck, Linda Gottfredson and Robert A. Gordon. Gordon (1992) wrote that "the survey dispels once and for all the media fiction that researchers like Jensen are outside of the mainstream because they examine such an impolitic hypothesis." Gottfredson (1994) claimed that the findings confirmed a systematic and ongoing attempt in the media and academia to promote the "egalitarian fiction" and "scientific fraud" that intelligence differences are entirely due to environmental causes.

A 1990 review of the book by behavior geneticist and IQ researcher Erik Turkheimer commented "The authors do not attempt to document their assertion that the opinion of scientific experts is colored by their political beliefs; thankfully, they can't make it stick." In a 1994 article entitled Media vs. Reality, psychologist Hans J. Eysenck cites the Snyderman and Rothman study as proof that, despite the reports of him and his views which have appeared in the media to the contrary, his findings have always been in "complete accord with orthodoxy". He complains of being misrepresented in the media as a "maverick" with "controversial" views who went against consensus. Eysenck sees the Snyderman and Rothman study as proving that "exactly the opposite is true".

In 2002, Frank Miele interviewed Arthur Jensen about the public and academic reception of his work. In his response, Jensen cites the Synderman and Rothman study as a "thorough presentation of expert opinion among behavior geneticists and psychometricians" on the subject of intelligence. When Miele points out that, despite the findings of Snyderman and Rothman to the effect that the majority of experts silently agree with Jensen's views, no official body such as the APA has issued a statement explicitly supporting him or his findings, Jensen responds that, in his opinion, no scientific organization such as the APA should make such public statements, as "these questions are not answered by a show of hands".

A long review by Silverman (1991) in the journal Gifted Child Quarterly described the book as important in the field of gifted education. She welcomed its endorsement of IQ tests, contrary to the press's indictment of intelligence testing, and praised it for affirming the heritability of intelligence in individuals from parents to children. She pointed out that, "Since Mark Snyderman has been a collaborator with Richard Herrnstein, the book may have been written partially in defense of Herrnstein, who was often barred from speaking engagements because of his views on the heritability of IQ," before concluding that, "Armed with the support of the psychological community that this book provides, we will be able to take an informed stand in attempting to preserve gifted education in the months ahead."

Professor of education Myron Lieberman described the Snyderman and Rothman study as "impressive evidence that the American people are misinformed about basic educational issues."

Another review by Lennon (1990) in Annals of the American Academy of Political and Social Science was less positive, describing the authors as giving "overwhelming approval" for Jensen's position and the book as "comprehensive and informative" on the controversy over IQ tests but also as "insensitive, irresponsible, and dangerous". He took particular issue with the last chapter where the authors picked out the "real culprits" in the controversy during the 1970s and 1980s: "the liberal press, a biased and uninformed 'elite'; media personalities, seekers of sensational topics only; universities and academics; environmentalists; civil rights activists who dared to question and confront the societal implementation of the in-place value system; and social service professionals who are responsible for 'liberal and cosmopolitan ideas'." He queried their assertion that a positive review in the press could sometimes provide "a more significant source of recognition and reward than that offered by professional journals."

Some commentators have been more incredulous, particularly about the single question concerning race and intelligence, "Which of the following best characterizes your opinion of the heritability of black-white differences in IQ?" Amongst the 661 returned questionnaires, 14% declined to answer the question, 24% voted that there was insufficient evidence to give an answer, 1% voted that the gap was "due entirely to genetic variation", 15% voted that it "due entirely to environmental variation" and 45% voted that it was a "product of genetic and environmental variation". Jencks & Phillips (1998) have pointed out that it was unclear to them how many of those who replied "both" would have agreed with them that genetics did not play a large role; it was also unclear to them whether those responding were familiar with the literature on the subject. Sternberg, Grigorenko & Kidd (2006), responding to a citation of the same question in a comment on one of their earlier papers, stated that they did not give "much credence" to the survey.

== See also ==
- Intelligence: Knowns and Unknowns (1996)
- Liberal media
- Mainstream Science on Intelligence (1994)
- Race and intelligence
- History of the race and intelligence controversy
