= Lee A. Thompson =

American psychologist

- Born: Lee Anne Thompson; United States
- Education: Case Western Reserve University (BA); University of Colorado Boulder (MA, PhD)
- Known for: Twin study on communication disorders
- Awards: Top educator of first-year students in the U.S.
- Scientific career
- Fields: Behavioural genetics, intelligence research
- Workplaces: Case Western Reserve University

Lee Anne Thompson is an American psychology professor known for her work in behavior genetics and the biological processes involved in intelligence.

== Career ==
Thompson earned her B.A. from Case Western Reserve University in 1982, then attended University of Colorado Boulder, earning an M.A. in 1985 and her Ph.D. in 1987. She currently teaches at Case Western and is on the editorial board of Intelligence.

Thompson co-authored a widely cited twin study on communication disorders which found higher concordance in monozygotic twins than dizygotic twins.

In 1994 she was one of 52 signatories on "Mainstream Science on Intelligence," an editorial written by Linda Gottfredson and published in the Wall Street Journal, which declared the consensus of the signing scholars on issues related to race and intelligence following the publication of the book The Bell Curve. Thompson has published studies with other signatories, including Douglas Detterman, Robert Plomin, and David Lubinski.

She has worked on studies attempting to locate DNA markers associated with high and low intelligence quotient. Thompson has also used fMRI to localize areas in the brain related to concentration.

In February 2013, Thompson was named top educator of first-year students in the U.S.
