= History of the race and intelligence controversy =

The history of the race and intelligence controversy concerns the historical development of a debate about possible explanations of group differences encountered in the study of race and intelligence. Since the beginning of IQ testing around the time of World War I, there have been observed differences between the average scores of different population groups, and there have been debates over whether this is mainly due to environmental and cultural factors, or mainly due to some as yet undiscovered genetic factor, or whether such a dichotomy between environmental and genetic factors is the appropriate framing of the debate. Today, the scientific consensus is that genetics does not explain differences in IQ test performance between racial groups.

Pseudoscientific claims of inherent differences in intelligence between races have played a central role in the history of scientific racism. In the late 19th and early 20th century, group differences in intelligence were often assumed to be racial in nature. Apart from intelligence tests, research relied on measurements such as brain size or reaction times. By the mid-1940s most psychologists had adopted the view that environmental and cultural factors predominated.

In the mid-1960s, physicist William Shockley sparked controversy by claiming there might be genetic reasons that black people in the United States tended to score lower on IQ tests than white people. In 1969 the educational psychologist Arthur Jensen published a long article with the suggestion that compensatory education could have failed to that date because of genetic group differences. A similar debate among academics followed the publication in 1994 of The Bell Curve by Richard Herrnstein and Charles Murray. Their book prompted a renewal of debate on the issue and the publication of several interdisciplinary books on the issue. A 1995 report from the American Psychological Association responded to the controversy, finding no conclusive explanation for the observed differences between average IQ scores of racial groups. More recent work by James Flynn, William Dickens and Richard Nisbett has highlighted the narrowing gap between racial groups in IQ test performance, along with other corroborating evidence that environmental rather than genetic factors are the cause of these differences.

== History ==
=== Early history ===
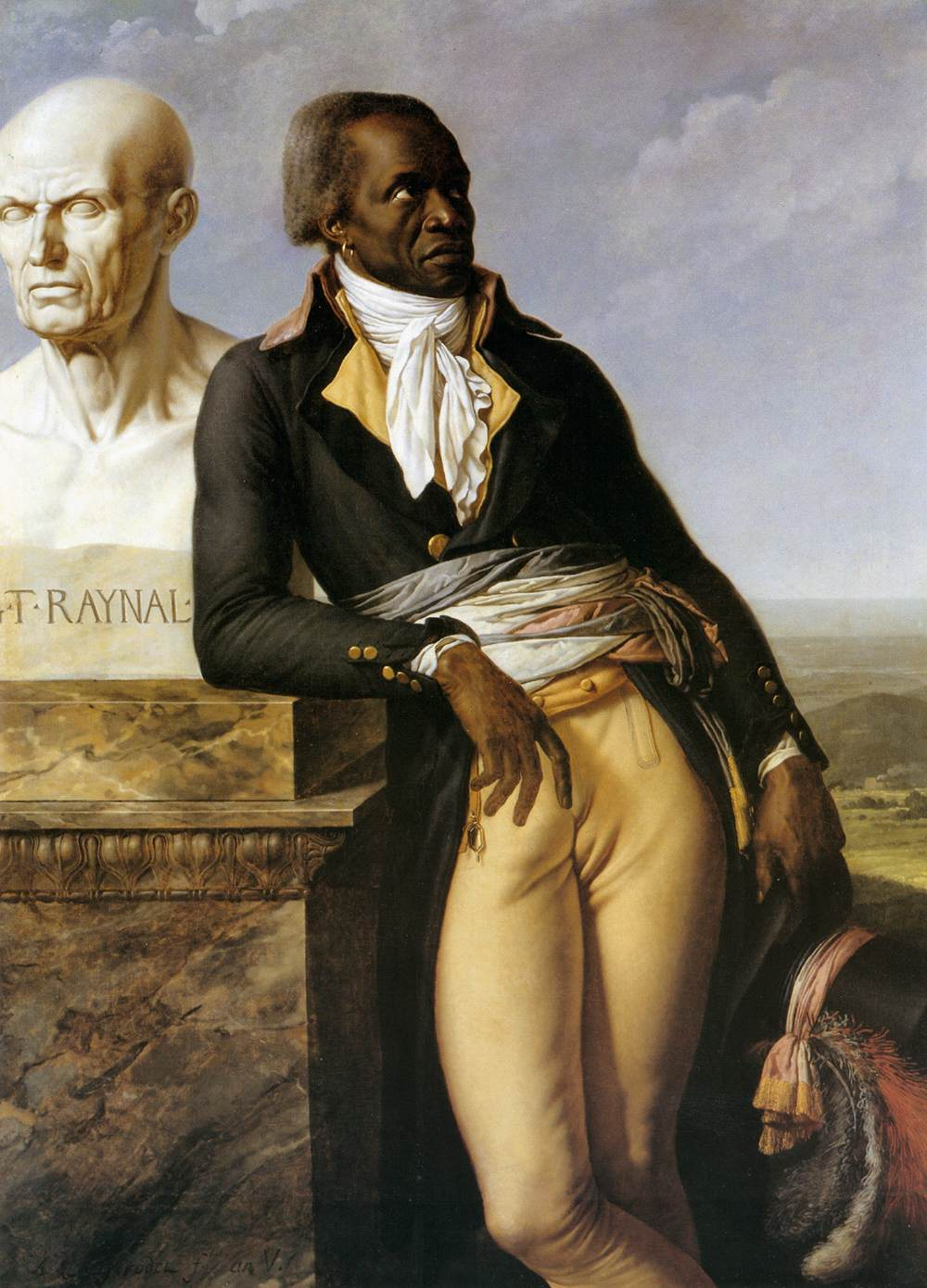
Jean-Baptiste Belley, an elected member of the National Convention and the Council of Five Hundred during the French First Republic, advocated for racial intellectual equality.

In the 18th century, debates surrounding the institution of slavery in the Americas hinged on the question of whether innate differences in intellectual capacity existed between races, in particular between black people and white people. Some European philosophers and scientists, such as Voltaire, David Hume, Immanuel Kant, and Carl Linnaeus, either argued or simply presupposed that white people were intellectually superior.

Others, such as Henri Gregoire and Constantin de Chasseboeuf, argued that ancient Egypt had been a black civilization, and that it was therefore black people who had "discovered the elements of science and art, at a time when all other men were barbarous." During the French Revolution, Jean-Baptiste Belley, an elected member of the National Convention and the Council of Five Hundred who had been born in Senegal, became a leading proponent of the idea of racial intellectual equality.

In 1785, Thomas Jefferson wrote of his "suspicion" that black people were "inferior to... whites in endowments both of body and mind." However, in 1791, after corresponding with the free African-American polymath Benjamin Banneker, Jefferson wrote that he hoped to see such "instances of moral eminence so multiplied as to prove that the want of talents observed in them is merely the effect of their degraded condition, and not proceeding from any difference in the structure of the parts on which intellect depends."

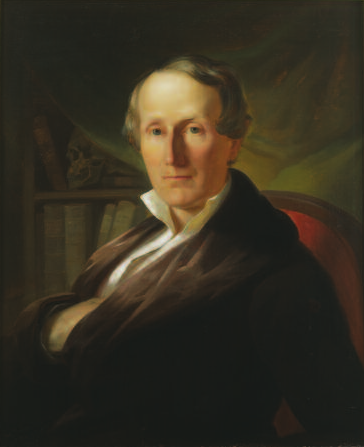
Samuel Morton, an American physician, used the study of human skulls to argue for racial differences in intelligence.

During the 19th and early 20th centuries, the idea that there are differences in the brain structures and brain sizes of different races, and that this implied differences in intelligence, was a popular topic, inspiring numerous typological studies. Samuel Morton's Crania Americana, published in 1839, was one such study, arguing that intelligence was correlated with brain size and that both of these metrics varied between racial groups.

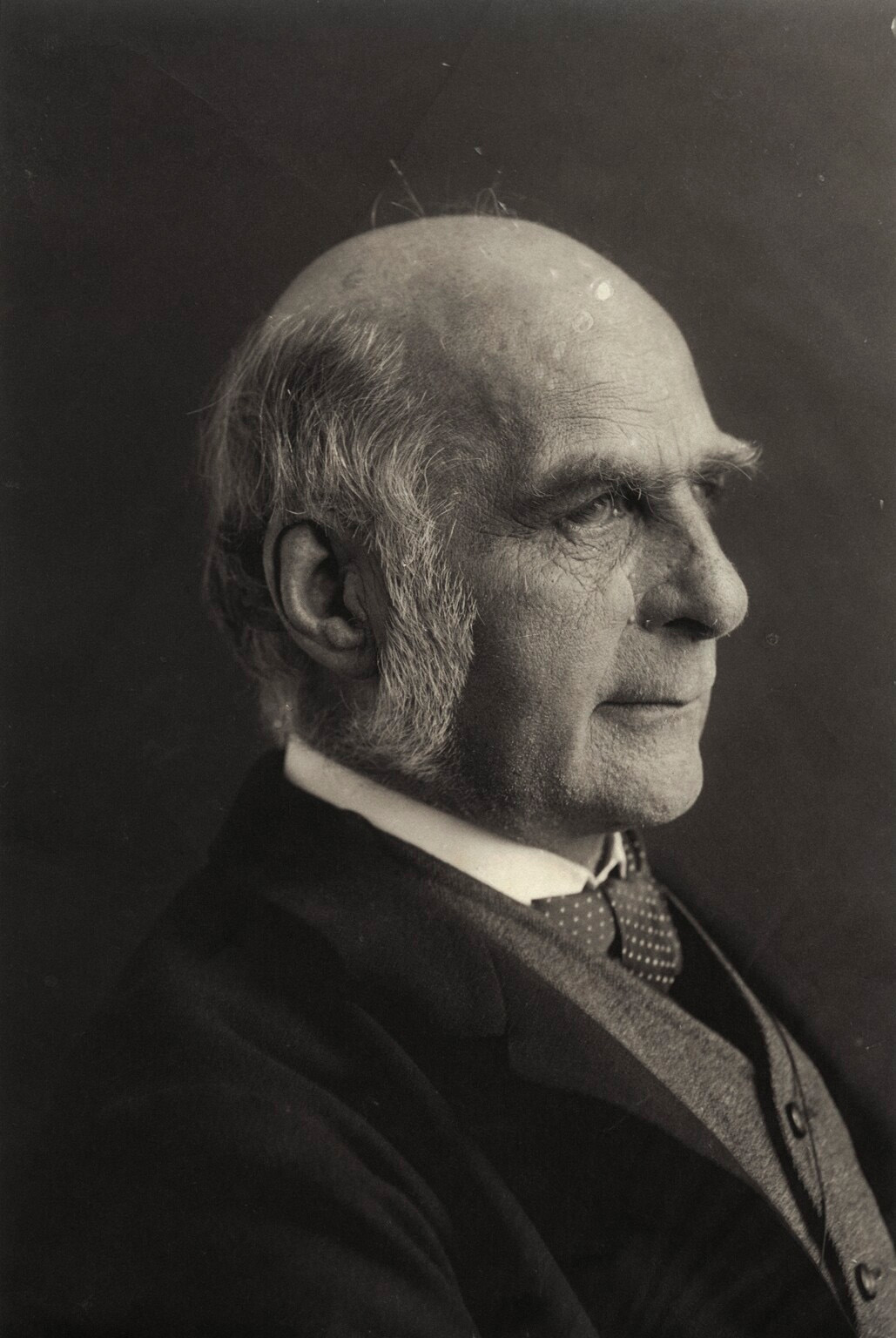
Francis Galton, an English eugenicist, argued that genius was unevenly distributed among racial groups.

Through the publication of his book Hereditary Genius in 1869, polymath Francis Galton spurred interest in the study of mental abilities, particularly as they relate to heredity and eugenics. Lacking the means to directly measure intellectual ability, Galton attempted to estimate the intelligence of various racial and ethnic groups. He based his estimations on observations from his and others' travels, the number and quality of intellectual achievements of different groups, and on the percentage of "eminent men" in each of these groups. Galton hypothesized that intelligence was normally distributed in all racial and ethnic groups, and that the means of these distributions varied between the groups. In Galton's estimation, ancient Attic Greeks had been the people with the highest incidence of genius intelligence, followed by contemporary Englishmen, with black Africans at a lower level, and Australian Aboriginals lower still. He did not specifically study Jews, but remarked that "they appear to be rich in families of high intellectual breeds".

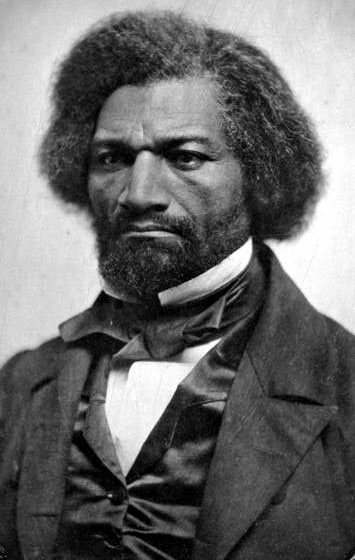
Autodidact and abolitionist Frederick Douglass served as a high-profile counterexample to myths of black intellectual inferiority.

Meanwhile, the American abolitionist and escaped slave Frederick Douglass had gained fame for his oratory and incisive writings, despite having learned to read as a child largely through surreptitious observation. Accordingly, he had been described by abolitionists as a living counter-example to slaveholders' arguments that people of African descent lacked the intellectual capacity to function as independent American citizens. His eloquence was so notable that some found it hard to believe he had once been a slave. In the later years of his life, one newspaper described him as "a bright example of the capability of the colored race, even under the blighting influence of slavery, from which he emerged and became one of the distinguished citizens of the country."

Other abolitionists of the 19th century continued to advance the theme of ancient Egypt as a black civilization as an argument against racism. On this basis, scholar and diplomat Alexander Hill Everett argued in his 1927 book America: "With regard to the intellectual capabilities of the African race, it may be observed that Africa was once the nursery of science and literature, and it was from thence that they were disseminated among the Greeks and Romans." Similarly, the philosopher John Stuart Mill posited in his 1849 essay "On the Negro Question" that "it was from Negroes, therefore, that the Greeks learnt their first lessons in civilization."

In 1895, R. Meade Bache of the University of Pennsylvania published an article in Psychological Review claiming that reaction time increases with evolution. Bache supported this claim with data showing slower reaction times among White Americans when compared with those of Native Americans and African Americans, with Native Americans having the quickest reaction time. He hypothesized that the slow reaction time of White Americans was to be explained by their possessing more contemplative brains which did not function well on tasks requiring automatic responses. This was one of the first examples of modern scientific racism, in which a veneer of science was used to bolster belief in the superiority of a particular race.

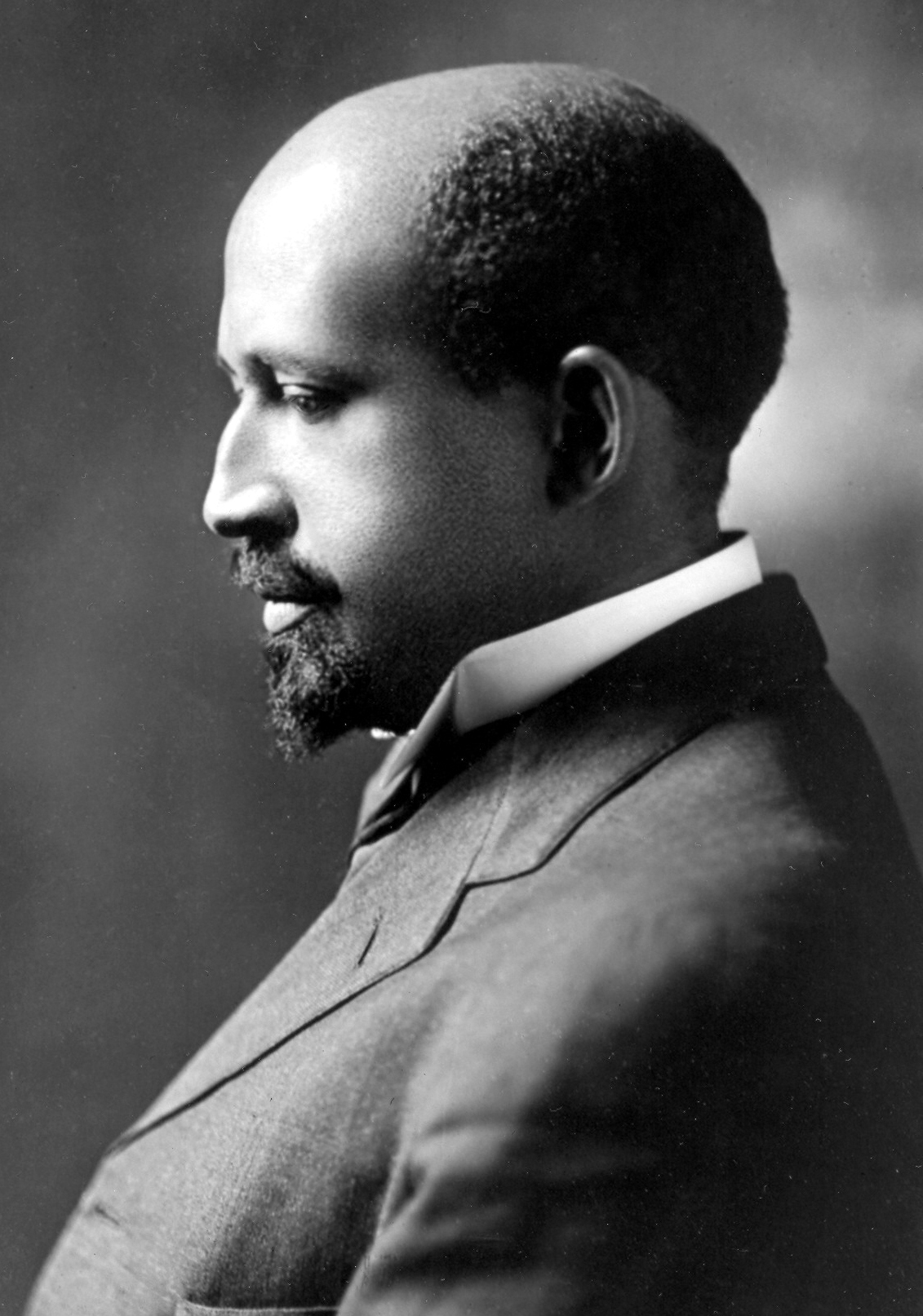
Sociologist W. E. B. Du Bois argued that black populations just as much as white ones naturally give rise to what he termed a "talented tenth" of intellectually gifted individuals.

=== 1900–1920 ===
In 1903, the pioneering African-American sociologist W. E. B. Du Bois published his landmark collection of essays The Souls of Black Folk in defense of the inherent mental capacity and equal humanity of black people. According to Manning Marable, this book "helped to create the intellectual argument for the black freedom struggle in the twentieth century. 'Souls' justified the pursuit of higher education for Negroes and thus contributed to the rise of the black middle class." In contrast to other civil rights leaders like Booker T. Washington, who advocated for incremental progress and vocational education as a way for black Americans to demonstrate the virtues of "industry, thrift, intelligence and property" to the white majority, Du Bois advocated for black schools to focus more on liberal arts and academic curriculum (including the classics, arts, and humanities), because liberal arts were required to develop a leadership elite. Du Bois argued that black populations just as much as white ones naturally give rise to what he termed a "talented tenth" of intellectually gifted individuals.

At the same time, the discourse of scientific racism was accelerating. In 1910 the sociologist Howard W. Odum published his book Mental and Social Traits of the Negro, which described African-American students as "lacking in filial affection, strong migratory instincts, and tendencies; little sense of veneration, integrity or honor; shiftless, indolent, untidy, improvident, extravagant, lazy, lacking in persistence and initiative and unwilling to work continuously at details. Indeed, experience with the Negro in classrooms indicates that it is impossible to get the child to do anything with continued accuracy, and similarly in industrial pursuits, the Negro shows a woeful lack of power of sustained activity and constructive conduct." As the historian of psychology Ludy T. Benjamin explains, "with such prejudicial beliefs masquerading as facts," it was at this time that educational segregation on the basis of race was imposed in some states.

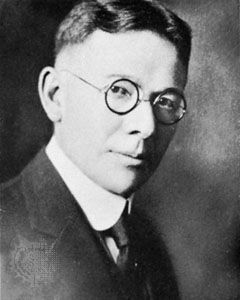
Psychologist Lewis Terman adapted the Stanford-Binet intelligence test and used it to argue for racial differences in intelligence.

The first practical intelligence test was developed between 1905 and 1908 by Alfred Binet in France for school placement of children. Binet warned that results from his test should not be assumed to measure innate intelligence or used to label individuals permanently. In 1916 Binet's test was translated into English and revised by Lewis Terman (who introduced IQ scoring for the test results) and published under the name Stanford–Binet Intelligence Scales. Terman wrote that Mexican-Americans, African-Americans, and Native Americans have a mental "dullness [that] seems to be racial, or at least inherent in the family stocks from which they come." He also argued for a higher frequency of so-called "morons" among non-white American racial groups, and concluded that there were "enormously significant racial differences in general intelligence" which could not be remedied by education.

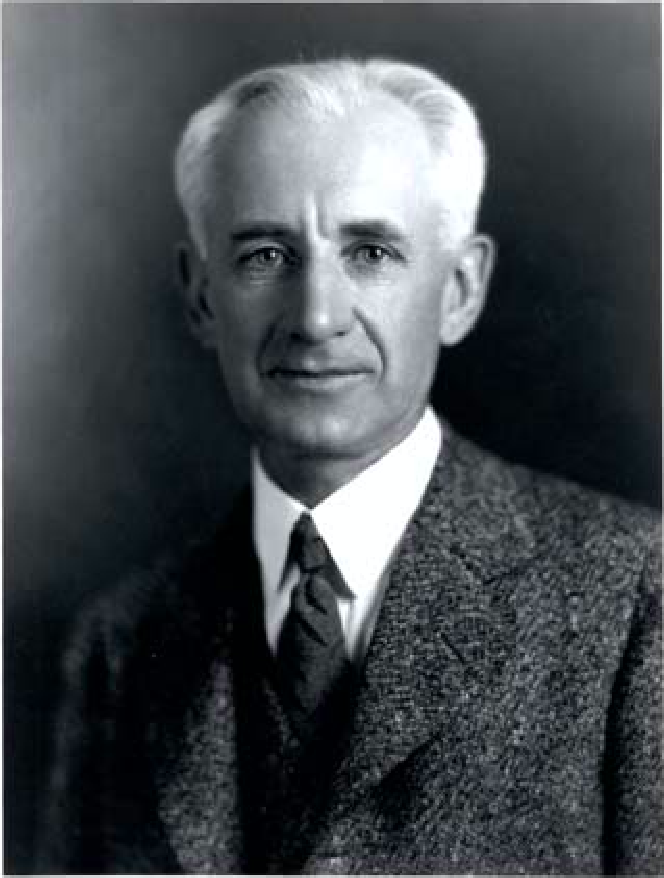
Psychologist Robert Yerkes argued that immigration from Southern and Eastern Europe could decrease the average IQ of Americans.

In 1916 a team of psychologists, led by Robert Yerkes and including Terman and Henry H. Goddard, adapted the Stanford-Binet tests as multiple-choice group tests for use by the US army. In 1919, Yerkes devised a version of this test for civilians, the National Intelligence Test, which was used in all levels of education and in business. Like Terman, Goddard had argued in his book, Feeble-mindedness: Its Causes and Consequences (1914), that "feeble-mindedness" was hereditary; and in 1920 Yerkes in his book with Yoakum on the Army Mental Tests described how they "were originally intended, and are now definitely known, to measure native intellectual ability". Both Goddard and Terman argued that the feeble-minded should not be allowed to reproduce. In the US, however, independently and prior to the IQ tests, there had been political pressure for such eugenic policies to be enforced by sterilization; consequently, IQ tests became used as justification for sterilizing intellectually disabled people.

Early IQ tests were also used to argue for limits to immigration to the US. Already in 1917, Goddard reported on the low IQ scores of new arrivals at Ellis Island. Yerkes argued on the basis of his army test scores that there were consistently lower IQ levels among those from Southern and Eastern Europe, which he suggested could lead to a decline in the average IQ of Americans if immigration from these regions were not limited.

=== 1920–1960 ===
In the 1920s, psychologists started questioning underlying assumptions of racial differences in intelligence; although not discounting them, the possibility was considered that they were on a smaller scale than previously supposed and also due to factors other than heredity. In 1924, Floyd Allport wrote in his book Social Psychology that the French sociologist Gustave Le Bon was incorrect in asserting "a gap between inferior and superior species", and pointed to "social inheritance" and "environmental factors" as accounting for differences. Nevertheless, he suggested that: "the intelligence of the white race is of a more versatile and complex order than that of the black race. It is probably superior to that of the red or yellow races."

In 1923, in his book A study of American intelligence, Carl Brigham wrote that on the basis of the Yerkes army tests: "The decline in intelligence is due to two factors, the change in races migrating to this country, and to the additional factor of sending lower and lower representatives of each race." He concluded that: "The steps that should be taken to preserve or increase our present mental capacity must, of course, be dictated by science and not by political expediency. Immigration should not only be restrictive, but highly selective." The Immigration Act of 1924 put these recommendations into practice, introducing quotas based on the 1890 census, prior to the waves of immigration from Poland and Italy. While Gould and Kamin argued that the psychometric claims of Nordic superiority had a profound influence on the institutionalization of the 1924 immigration law, other scholars have argued that "the eventual passage of the 'racist' immigration law of 1924 was not crucially affected by the contributions of Yerkes or other psychologists".

In 1929, Robert Woodworth, in his textbook Psychology: A Study of Mental Life, made no claims about innate differences in intelligence between races, pointing instead to environmental and cultural factors. He considered it advisable to "suspend judgment and keep our eyes open from year to year for fresh and more conclusive evidence that will probably be discovered".

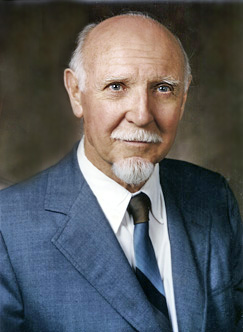
Raymond Cattell, known for psychometric research into intrapersonal psychological structure, advocated that supposedly inferior races should be euthanized.

In the 1930s, the English psychologist Raymond Cattell wrote three tracts, Psychology and Social Progress (1933), The Fight for Our National Intelligence (1937) and Psychology and the Religious Quest (1938). The second was published by the Eugenics Society, of which he had been a research fellow; it predicted the disastrous consequences of not stopping the decline in the average intelligence in Britain by one point per decade. In 1933, Cattell wrote that, of all the European races, the "Nordic race was the most evolved in intelligence and stability of temperament". He argued for "no mixture of bloods between racial groups" because "the resulting re-shuffling of impulses and psychic units throws together in each individual a number of forces which may be incompatible". He rationalised the "hatred and abhorrence ... for the Jewish practice of living in other nations instead of forming an independent self-sustained group of their own", referring to them as "intruders" with a "crafty spirit of calculation". He recommended a rigid division of races, referring to those suggesting that individuals be judged on their merits, irrespective of racial background, as "race-slumpers". He wrote that in the past, "the backward branches of the tree of mankind" had been lopped off as "the American Indians, the Black Australians, the Mauris and the negroes had been driven by bloodshed from their lands", unaware of "the biological rationality of that destiny". He advocated what he saw as a more enlightened solution: by birth control, by sterilization, and by "life in adapted reserves and asylums", where the "races which have served their turn [should] be brought to euthanasia." He considered blacks to be naturally inferior, on account of their supposedly "small skull capacity". In 1937, he praised the Third Reich for their eugenic laws and for "being the first to adopt sterilization together with a policy of racial improvement". In 1938, after newspapers had reported on the segregation of Jews into ghettos and concentration camps, he commented that the rise of Germany "should be welcomed by the religious man as reassuring evidence that in spite of modern wealth and ease, we shall not be allowed ... to adopt foolish social practices in fatal detachment from the stream of evolution". In late 1937, Cattell moved to the US on the invitation of the psychologist Edward Thorndike of Columbia University, also involved in eugenics. He spent the rest of his life there as a research psychologist, devoting himself after retirement to devising and publicising a refined version of his ideology from the 1930s that he called beyondism.

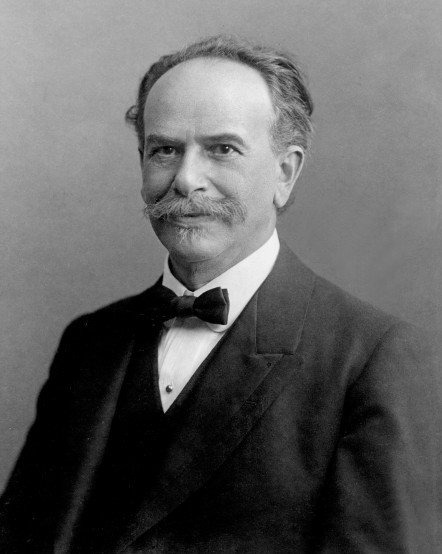
Franz Boas, regarded as the father of anthropology in the US, had a lasting influence on the work of Otto Klineberg and his generation.

In 1935, Otto Klineberg wrote two books, Negro Intelligence and Selective Migration and Race Differences, dismissing claims that African Americans in the northern states were more intelligent than those in the south. He argued that there was no scientific proof of racial differences in intelligence and that this should not therefore be used as a justification for policies in education or employment.

The hereditarian view began to change in the 1920s in reaction to excessive eugenicist claims regarding abilities and moral character, and also due to the development of convincing environmental arguments. In the 1940s many psychologists, particularly social psychologists, began to argue that environmental and cultural factors, as well as discrimination and prejudice, provided a more probable explanation of disparities in intelligence. According to Franz Samelson, this change in attitude had become widespread by then, with very few studies in race differences in intelligence, a change brought out by an increase in the number of psychologists not from a "lily-white ... Anglo-Saxon" background but from Jewish backgrounds. Other factors that influenced American psychologists were the economic changes brought about by the depression and the reluctance of psychologists to risk being associated with the Nazi claims of a master race. The 1950 race statement of UNESCO, prepared in consultation with scientists including Klineberg, created a further taboo against conducting scientific research on issues related to race. Adolf Hitler banned IQ testing for being "Jewish" as did Joseph Stalin for being "bourgeois".

=== 1960–1980 ===
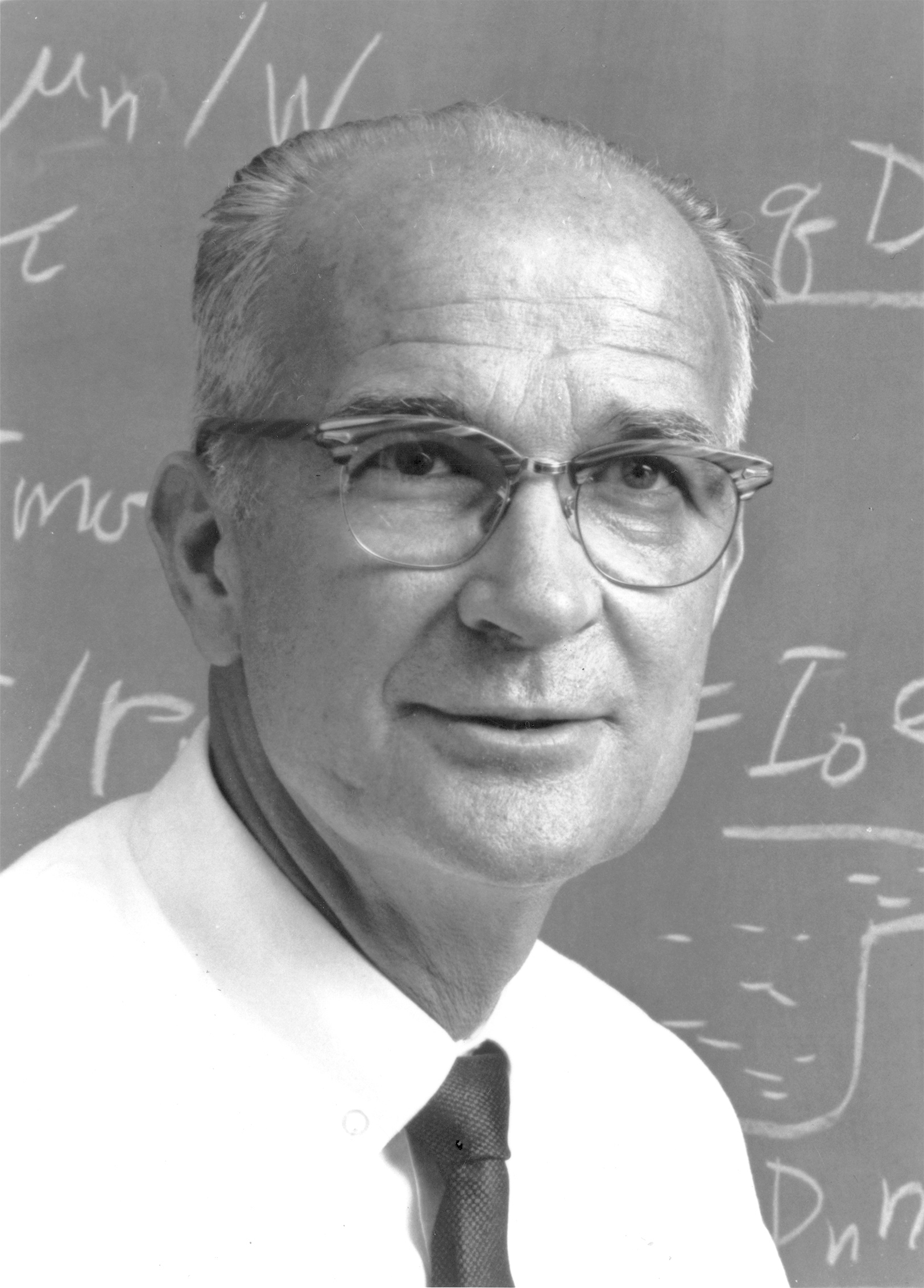
William Shockley, the Nobel laureate in physics, suggested that the decline in the average IQ in the US could be solved by eugenics.

In 1965 William Shockley, Nobel laureate in physics and professor at Stanford University, made a public statement at the Nobel conference on "Genetics and the Future of Man" about the problems of "genetic deterioration" in humans caused by "evolution in reverse". He claimed social support systems designed to help the disadvantaged had a regressive effect. Shockley subsequently claimed the most competent American population group were the descendants of original European settlers, because of the extreme selective pressures imposed by the harsh conditions of early colonialism. Speaking of the "genetic enslavement" of African Americans, owing to an abnormally high birth rate, Shockley discouraged improved education as a remedy, suggesting instead sterilization and birth control. In the following ten years he continued to argue in favor of this position, claiming it was not based on prejudice but "on sound statistics". Shockley's outspoken public statements and lobbying brought him into contact with those running the Pioneer Fund who subsequently, through the intermediary Carleton Putnam, provided financial support for his extensive lobbying activities in this area, reported widely in the press. With the psychologist and segregationist R. Travis Osborne as adviser, he formed the Foundation for Research and Education on Eugenics and Dysgenics (FREED). Although its stated purpose was "solely for scientific and educational purposes related to human population and quality problems", FREED mostly acted as a lobbying agency for spreading Shockley's ideas on eugenics.

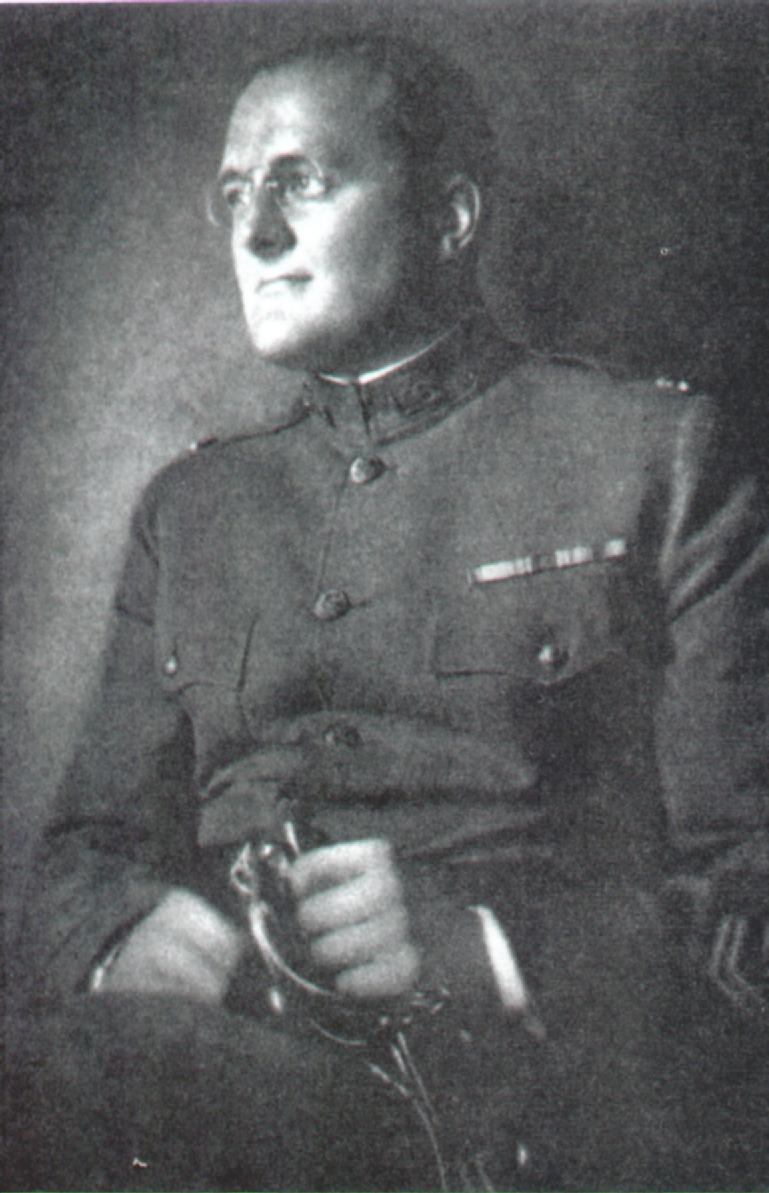
Wickliffe Draper, founder of the Pioneer Fund

The Pioneer Fund had been set up by Wickliffe Draper in 1937 with one of its two charitable purposes being to provide aid for "study and research into the problems of heredity and eugenics in the human race" and "into the problems of race betterment with special reference to the people of the United States". From the late fifties onwards, following the 1954 Supreme Court decision on segregation in schools, it supported psychologists and other scientists in favour of segregation. All of these ultimately held academic positions in the Southern states, notably Henry E. Garrett (head of psychology at Columbia University until 1955), Wesley Critz George, Frank C.J. McGurk, R. Travis Osborne and Audrey Shuey, who in 1958 wrote The Testing of Negro Intelligence, demonstrating "the presence of native differences between Negroes and whites as determined by intelligence tests". In 1959 Garrett helped to found the International Association for the Advancement of Ethnology and Eugenics, an organisation promoting segregation. In 1961 he blamed the shift away from hereditarianism, which he described as the "scientific hoax of the century", on the school of thought –the "Boas cult" – promoted by his former colleagues at Columbia, notably Franz Boas and Otto Klineberg, and more generally "Jewish organizations", most of whom "belligerently support the egalitarian dogma which they accept as having been 'scientifically' proved". He also pointed to Marxist origins in this shift, writing in a pamphlet, Desegregation: Fact and hokum, that: "It is certain that the Communists have aided in the acceptance and spread of egalitarianism although the extent and method of their help is difficult to assess. Egalitarianism is good Marxist doctrine, not likely to change with gyrations in the Kremlin line." In 1951 Garrett had even gone as far as reporting Klineberg to the FBI for advocating "many Communistic theories", including the idea that "there are no differences in the races of mankind".

One of Shockley's lobbying campaigns involved the educational psychologist, Arthur Jensen, of the University of California, Berkeley (UC Berkeley). Although earlier in his career Jensen had favored environmental rather than genetic factors as the explanation of race differences in intelligence, he had changed his mind during 1966-1967 when he was at the Center for Advanced Study in the Behavioral Sciences at Stanford. Here Jensen met Shockley and through him received support for his research from the Pioneer Fund. Although Shockley and Jensen's names were later to become linked in the media, Jensen does not mention Shockley as an important influence on his thought in his subsequent writings; rather he describes as decisive his work with Hans Eysenck. He also mentions his interest in the behaviorist theories of Clark L. Hull which he says he abandoned largely because he found them to be incompatible with experimental findings during his years at Berkeley.

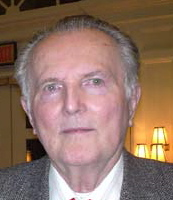
Arthur Jensen, professor of educational psychology at UC Berkeley, wrote the 1969 article on intelligence that became one of the most controversial articles in the history of psychology.

In a 1968 article published in Disadvantaged Child, Jensen questioned the effectiveness of child development and antipoverty programs, writing: "As a social policy, avoidance of the issue could be harmful to everyone in the long run, especially to future generations of Negroes, who could suffer the most from well-meaning but misguided and ineffective attempts to improve their lot." In 1969 Jensen wrote a long article in the Harvard Educational Review, "How Much Can We Boost IQ and Scholastic Achievement?"

In his article, 123 pages long, Jensen insisted on the accuracy and lack of bias in intelligence tests, stating that the absolute quantity g that they measured, the general intelligence factor, first introduced by the English psychologist Charles Spearman in 1904, "stood like a Rock of Gibraltar in psychometrics". He stressed the importance of biological considerations in intelligence, commenting that "the belief in the almost infinite plasticity of intellect, the ostrich-like denial of biological factors in individual differences, and the slighting of the role of genetics in the study of intelligence can only hinder investigation and understanding of the conditions, processes, and limits through which the social environment influences human behavior." He argued at length that, contrary to environmentalist orthodoxy, intelligence was partly dependent on the same genetic factors that influence other physical attributes. More controversially, he briefly speculated that the difference in performance at school between blacks and whites might have a partly genetic explanation, commenting that there were "various lines of evidence, no one of which is definitive alone, but which, viewed all together, make it a not unreasonable hypothesis that genetic factors are strongly implicated in the average Negro-white intelligence difference. The preponderance of the evidence is, in my opinion, less consistent with a strictly environmental hypothesis than with a genetic hypothesis, which, of course, does not exclude the influence of environment or its interaction with genetic factors." He advocated the allocation of educational resources according to merit and insisted on the close correlation between intelligence and occupational status, arguing that "in a society that values and rewards individual talent and merit, genetic factors inevitably take on considerable importance." Concerned that the average IQ in the US was inadequate to answer the increasing needs of an industrialised society, he predicted that people with lower IQs would become unemployable while at the same time there would be an insufficient number with higher IQs to fill professional posts. He felt that eugenic reform would prevent this more effectively than compensatory education, surmising that "the technique for raising intelligence per se in the sense of g, probably lie more in the province of biological science than in psychology or education". He pointed out that intelligence and family size were inversely correlated, particularly amongst the black population, so that the current trend in average national intelligence was dysgenic rather than eugenic. As he wrote, "Is there a danger that current welfare policies, unaided by eugenic foresight, could lead to the genetic enslavement of a substantial segment of our population? The fuller consequences of our failure seriously to study these questions may well be judged by future generations as our society's greatest injustice to Negro Americans." He concluded by emphasizing the importance of child-centered education. Although a tradition had developed for the exclusive use of cognitive learning in schools, Jensen argued that it was not suited to "these children's genetic and cultural heritage": although capable of associative learning and memorization ("Level I" ability), they had difficulties with abstract conceptual reasoning ("Level II" ability). He felt that in these circumstances the success of education depended on exploiting "the actual potential learning that is latent in these children's patterns of abilities". He suggested that, in order to ensure equality of opportunity, "schools and society must provide a range and diversity of educational methods, programs and goals, and of occupational opportunities, just as wide as the range of human abilities."

Later, writing about how the article came into being, Jensen said that the editors of the Review had specifically asked him to include his view on the heritability of race differences, which he had not previously published. He also maintains that only five percent of the article touched on the topic of race difference in IQ. Cronbach (1975) also gave a detailed account of how the student editors of Harvard Educational Review commissioned and negotiated the content of Jensen's article.

Many academics have given commentaries on what they considered to be the main points of Jensen's article and the subsequent books in the early 1970s that expanded on its content. According to Jencks & Phillips (1998), in his article Jensen had argued "that educational programs for disadvantaged children initiated as the War on Poverty had failed, and the black-white race gap probably had a substantial genetic component." They summarised Jensen's argument as follows:

1. "Most of the variation in black-white scores is genetic"
2. "No one has advanced a plausible environmental explanation for the black-white gap"
3. "Therefore it is more reasonable to assume that part of the black-white gap is genetic in origin"

According to Loehlin, Lindzey & Spuhler (1975), Jensen's article defended 3 claims:

1. IQ tests provide accurate measurements of a real human ability that is relevant in many aspects of life.
2. Intelligence, as measured by IQ tests, is highly (about 80%) heritable and parents with low IQs are much more likely to have children with low IQs
3. Educational programs have been unable to significantly change the intelligence of individuals or groups.

According to Webster (1997), the article claimed "a correlation between intelligence, measured by IQ tests, and racial genes". He wrote that Jensen, based on empirical evidence, had concluded that "black intelligence was congenitally inferior to that of whites"; that "this partly explains unequal educational achievements"; and that, "because a certain level of underachievement was due to the inferior genetic attributes of blacks, compensatory and enrichment programs are bound to be ineffective in closing the racial gap in educational achievements." Several commentators mention Jensen's recommendations for schooling: according to Barry Nurcombe,

Jensen's own research suggests that IQ tests amalgamate two forms of thinking which are hierarchically related but which become differentially distributed in the population according to SES: level 1 and level 2, associative learning and abstract thinking (g), respectively. Blacks do as well as whites on tests of associative learning, but they fall behind on abstract thinking. The educational system should attend to this discrepancy and derive a more pluralistic approach. The current system puts minority groups at a marked disadvantage, since it overemphasizes g-type thinking.

Jensen had already suggested in the article that initiatives like the Head Start Program were ineffective, writing in the opening sentence, "Compensatory education has been tried and it apparently has failed." Other experts in psychometrics, such as Flynn (1980) and Mackintosh (1998), have given accounts of Jensen's theory of Level I and Level II abilities, which originated in this and earlier articles. As the historian of psychology William H. Tucker commented, Jensen's question is leading: "Is there a danger that current welfare policies, unaided by eugenic foresight, could lead to the genetic enslavement of a substantial segment of our population? The fuller consequences of our failure seriously to study these questions may well be judged by future generations as our society's greatest injustice to Negro Americans". Tucker noted that it repeats Shockley's phrase "genetic enslavement", which proved later to be one of the most inflammatory statements in the article.

Shockley conducted a widespread publicity campaign for Jensen's article, supported by the Pioneer Fund. Jensen's views became widely known in many spheres. As a result, there was renewed academic interest in the hereditarian viewpoint and in intelligence tests. Jensen's original article was widely circulated and often cited; the material was taught in university courses over a range of academic disciplines. In response to his critics, Jensen wrote a series of books on all aspects of psychometrics. There was also a widespread positive response from the popular press — with The New York Times Magazine dubbing the topic "Jensenism" — and amongst politicians and policy makers.

In 1971 Richard Herrnstein wrote a long article on intelligence tests in The Atlantic for a general readership. Undecided on the issues of race and intelligence, he discussed instead score differences between social classes. Like Jensen he took a firmly hereditarian point of view. He also commented that the policy of equal opportunity would result in making social classes more rigid, separated by biological differences, resulting in a downward trend in average intelligence that would conflict with the growing needs of a technological society.

Jensen and Herrnstein's articles were widely discussed. Hans Eysenck defended the hereditarian point of view and the use of intelligence tests in "Race, Intelligence and Education" (1971), a pamphlet presenting Jensenism to a popular audience, and "The Inequality of Man" (1973). He was severely critical of anti-hereditarians whose policies he blamed for many of the problems in society. In the first book he wrote that, "All the evidence to date suggests the strong and indeed overwhelming importance of genetic factors in producing the great variety of intellectual differences which [are] observed between certain racial groups", adding in the second, that "for anyone wishing to perpetuate class or caste differences, genetics is the real foe". "Race, Intelligence and Education" was immediately criticized in strong terms by IQ researcher Sandra Scarr as an "uncritical popularization of Jensen's ideas without the nuances and qualifiers that make much of Jensen's writing credible or at least responsible." Later scholars have identified errors and suspected data manipulation in Eysenck's work. An inquiry on behalf of King's College London found 26 of his papers to be "incompatible with modern clinical science". Rod Buchanan, a biographer of Eysenck, has argued that 87 publications by Eysenck should be retracted.

Student groups and faculty at Berkeley and Harvard protested Jensen and Herrnstein with charges of racism. Two weeks after the appearance of Jensen's article, Students for a Democratic Society staged protests against Arthur Jensen on the campus of the University of California, Berkeley, chanting "Fight racism. Fire Jensen!" Jensen himself states that he even lost his employment at Berkeley because of the controversy. Similar campaigns were waged in London against Eysenck and in Boston against sociobiologist Edward Wilson. The attacks on Wilson were orchestrated by the Sociobiology Study Group, part of the left wing organization Science for the People, formed of 35 scientists and students, including the Harvard biologists Stephen J. Gould and Richard Lewontin, who both became prominent critics of hereditarian research in race and intelligence. In 1972 50 academics, including the psychologists Jensen, Eysenck, and Herrnstein as well as five Nobel laureates, signed a statement entitled "Resolution on Scientific Freedom Regarding Human Behavior and Heredity", criticizing the climate of "suppression, punishment and defamation of scientists who emphasized the role of heredity in human behavior". In October 1973 a half-page advertisement entitled "Resolution Against Racism" appeared in The New York Times. With over 1000 academic signatories, including Lewontin, it condemned "racist research", denouncing in particular Jensen, Shockley and Herrnstein.

This was accompanied by commentaries, criticisms and denouncements from the academic community. Two issues of the Harvard Educational Review were devoted to critiques of Jensen's work by psychologists, biologists and educationalists. As documented by Wooldridge (1995), the main commentaries involved: population genetics (Richard Lewontin, Luigi Cavalli-Sforza, Walter Bodmer); the heritability of intelligence (Christopher Jencks, Mary Jo Bane, Leon Kamin, David Layzer); the possible inaccuracy of IQ tests as measures of intelligence (summarised in Jensen 1980, pp. 20–21); and sociological assumptions about the relationship between intelligence and income (Jencks and Bane). More specifically, the Harvard biologist Richard Lewontin commented on Jensen's use of population genetics, writing that, "The fundamental error of Jensen's argument is to confuse heritability of character within a population with heritability between two populations." Jensen denied making such a claim, saying that his argument was that high within-group heritability increased the probability of non-zero between-group heritability. The political scientists Christopher Jencks and Mary Jo Bane, also from Harvard, recalculated the heritability of intelligence as 45% instead of Jensen's estimate of 80%; and they calculated that only about 12% of variation in income was due to IQ, so that in their view the connections between IQ and occupation were less clear than Jensen had suggested.

Ideological differences also emerged in the controversy. The circle of scientists around Lewontin and Gould rejected the research of Jensen and Herrnstein as "bad science". While not objecting to research into intelligence per se, they felt that this research was politically motivated and objected to the reification of intelligence: the treatment of the numerical quantity g as a physical attribute like skin color that could be meaningfully averaged over a population group. They claimed that this was contrary to the scientific method, which required explanations at a molecular level, rather than the analysis of a statistical artifact in terms of undiscovered processes in biology or genetics. In response to this criticism, Jensen later wrote: "... what Gould has mistaken for 'reification' is neither more nor less than the common practice in every science of hypothesizing explanatory models to account for the observed relationships within a given domain. Well known examples include the heliocentric theory of planetary motion, the Bohr atom, the electromagnetic field, the kinetic theory of gases, gravitation, quarks, Mendelian genes, mass, velocity, etc. None of these constructs exists as a palpable entity occupying physical space." He asked why psychology should be denied "the common right of every science to the use of hypothetical constructs or any theoretical speculation concerning causal explanations of its observable phenomena".

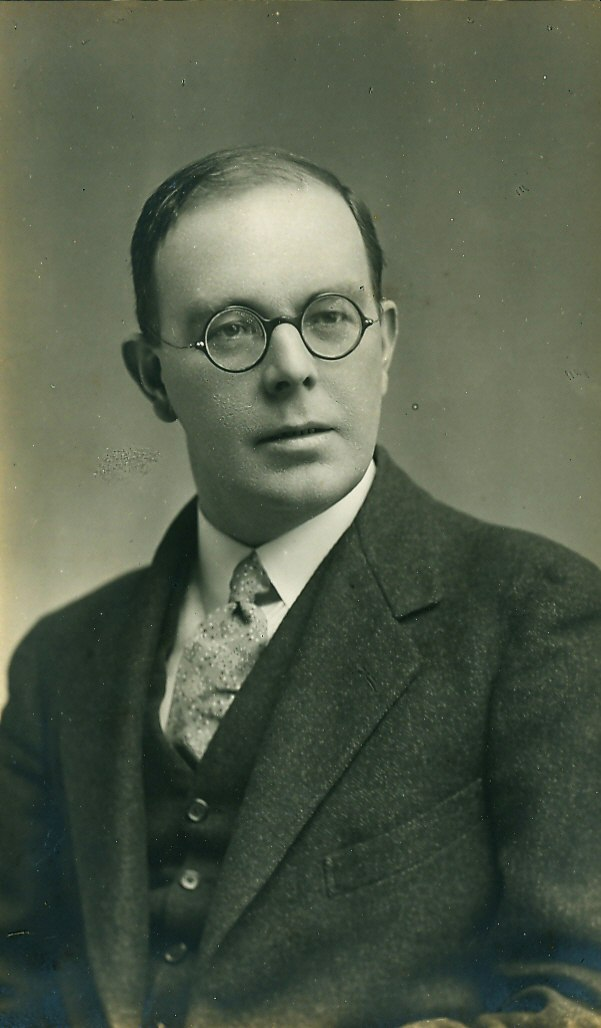
Cyril Burt, the English educationalist whose disputed twin studies were used as data by Jensen in some of his early articles and books

The academic debate also became entangled with the so-called "Burt Affair", because Jensen's article had partially relied on the 1966 twin studies of the British educational psychologist Sir Cyril Burt: shortly after Burt's death in 1971, there were allegations, prompted by research of Leon Kamin, that Burt had fabricated parts of his data, charges which have never been fully resolved. Franz Samelson documents how Jensen's views on Burt's work varied over the years: Jensen was Burt's main defender in the US during the 1970s. In 1983, following the publication in 1978 of Leslie Hearnshaw's official biography of Burt, Jensen changed his mind, "fully accept[ing] as valid ... Hearnshaw's biography" and stating that "of course [Burt] will never be exonerated for his empirical deceptions". However, in 1992, he wrote that "the essence of the Burt affair ... [was] a cabal of motivated opponents, avidly aided by the mass media, to bash [Burt's] reputation completely", a view repeated in an invited address on Burt before the American Psychological Association, when he called into question Hearnshaw's scholarship.

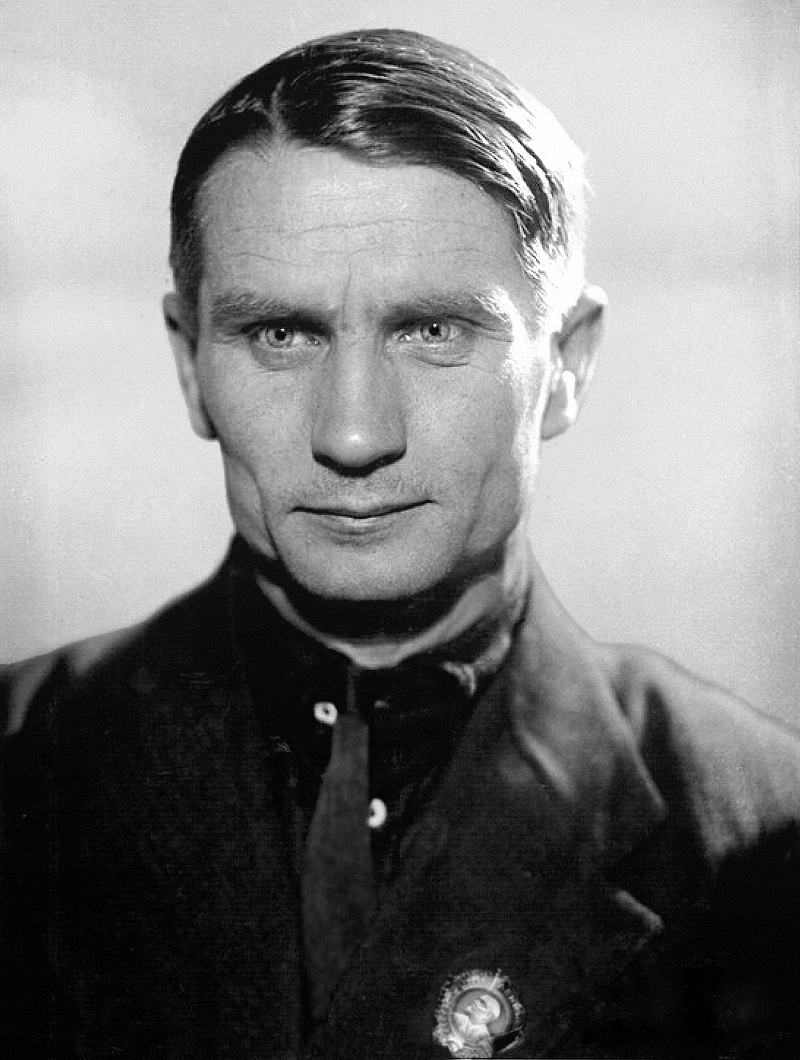
Trofim Lysenko who, as director of Soviet research in biology under Joseph Stalin, blocked research into genetics for ideological reasons

Similar charges of a politically motivated campaign to stifle scientific research on racial differences, later dubbed "Neo-Lysenkoism", were frequently repeated by Jensen and his supporters. Jensen (1972) bemoaned the fact that "a block has been raised because of the obvious implications for the understanding of racial differences in ability and achievement. Serious considerations of whether genetic as well as environmental factors are involved has been taboo in academic circles", adding that: "In the bizarre racist theories of the Nazis and the disastrous Lysenkoism of the Soviet Union under Stalin, we have seen clear examples of what happens when science is corrupted by subservience to political dogma."

After the appearance of his 1969 article, Jensen was later more explicit about racial differences in intelligence, stating in 1973 "that something between one-half and three-fourths of the average IQ differences between American Negroes and whites is attributable to genetic factors." He even speculated that the underlying mechanism was a "biochemical connection between skin pigmentation and intelligence" linked to their joint development in the ectoderm of the embryo. Although Jensen avoided any personal involvement with segregationists in the US, he did not distance himself from the approaches of journals of the far right in Europe, many of whom viewed his research as justifying their political ends. In an interview with Nation Europa, he said that some human races differed from one another even more than some animal species, claiming that a measurement of "genetic distance" between blacks and whites showed that they had diverged over 46,000 years ago. He also granted interviews to Alain de Benoist's French journal Nouvelle École and Jürgen Rieger's German journal Neue Anthropologie of which he later became a regular contributor and editor.

The debate was further exacerbated by issues of racial bias that had already intensified through the 1960s because of civil rights concerns and changes in the social climate. In 1968 the Association of Black Psychologists (ABP) had demanded a moratorium on IQ tests for children from minority groups. After a committee set up by the American Psychological Association drew up guidelines for assessing minority groups, failing to confirm the claims of racial bias, Jackson (1975) wrote the following as part of a response on behalf of the ABP:

Psychological testing historically has been a quasi-scientific tool in the perpetuation of racism on all levels of scientific objectivity, it [testing] has provided a cesspool of intrinsically and inferentially fallacious data which inflates the egos of whites by demeaning Black people and threatens to potentiate Black genocide.

Other professional academic bodies reacted to the dispute differently. The Society for the Psychological Study of Social Issues, a division of the American Psychological Society, issued a public statement in 1969 criticizing Jensen's research, declaring that, "To construct questions about complex behavior in terms of heredity versus environment is to oversimplify the essence and nature of human development and behavior." The American Anthropological Association convened a panel discussion in 1969 at its annual general meeting, shortly after the appearance of Jensen's paper, where several participants labelled his research as "racist". Subsequently, the association issued an official clarification, stating that, "The shabby misuse of IQ testing in the support of past American racist policies has created understandable anxiety over current research on the inheritance of human intelligence. But the resulting personal attacks on a few scientists with unpopular views has had a chilling effect on the entire field of behavioral genetics and clouds public discussion of its implications." In 1975 the Genetics Society of America made a similarly cautious statement: "The application of the techniques of quantitative genetics to the analysis of human behavior is fraught with human complications and potential biases, but well-designed research on the genetic and environmental components of human psychological traits may yield valid and socially useful results and should not be discouraged."

=== 1980–2000 ===
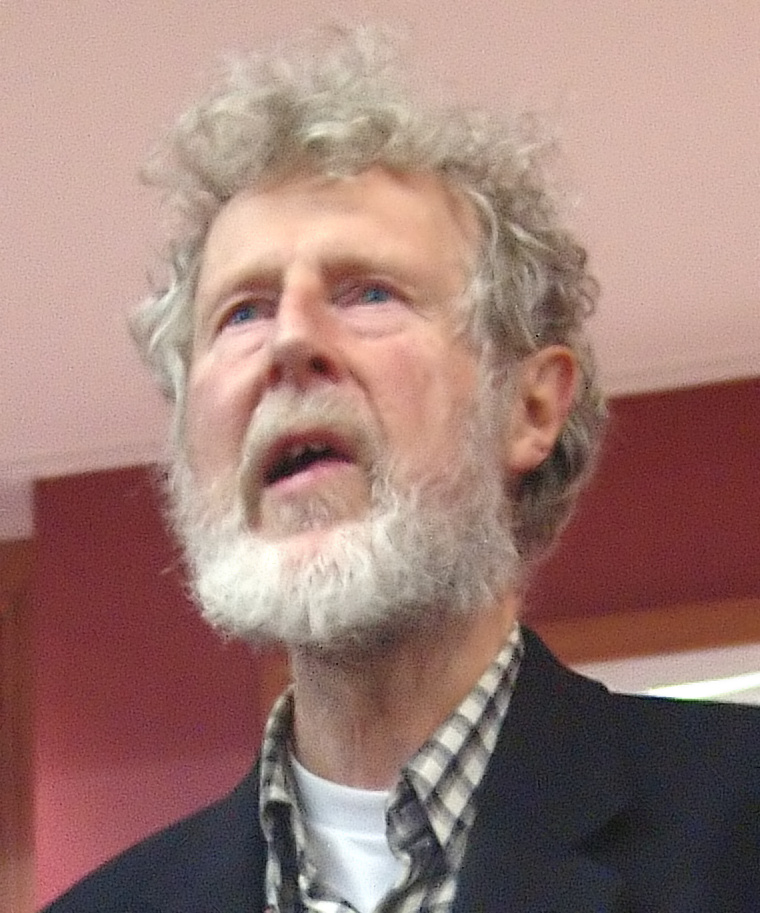
James Flynn, the New Zealand political scientist who has studied changes in group-level IQ averages over time

In the 1980s, political scientist James Flynn compared the results of groups who took both older and newer versions of specific IQ tests. His research led him to the discovery of what is now called the Flynn effect: a substantial increase in average IQ scores over the years across all groups tested. His discovery was confirmed later by many other studies. While trying to understand these remarkable test score increases, Flynn had postulated in 1987 that "IQ tests do not measure intelligence but rather a correlate with a weak causal link to intelligence". By 2009, however, Flynn felt that the IQ test score changes are real. He suggests that our fast-changing world has faced successive generations with new cognitive challenges that have considerably stimulated intellectual ability. "Our brains as presently constructed probably have much excess capacity ready to be used if needed. That was certainly the case in 1900." Flynn notes that "Our ancestors in 1900 were not mentally retarded. Their intelligence was anchored in everyday reality. We differ from them in that we can use abstractions and logic and the hypothetical to attack the formal problems that arise when science liberates thought from concrete situations. Since 1950, we have become more ingenious in going beyond previously learned rules to solve problems on the spot."

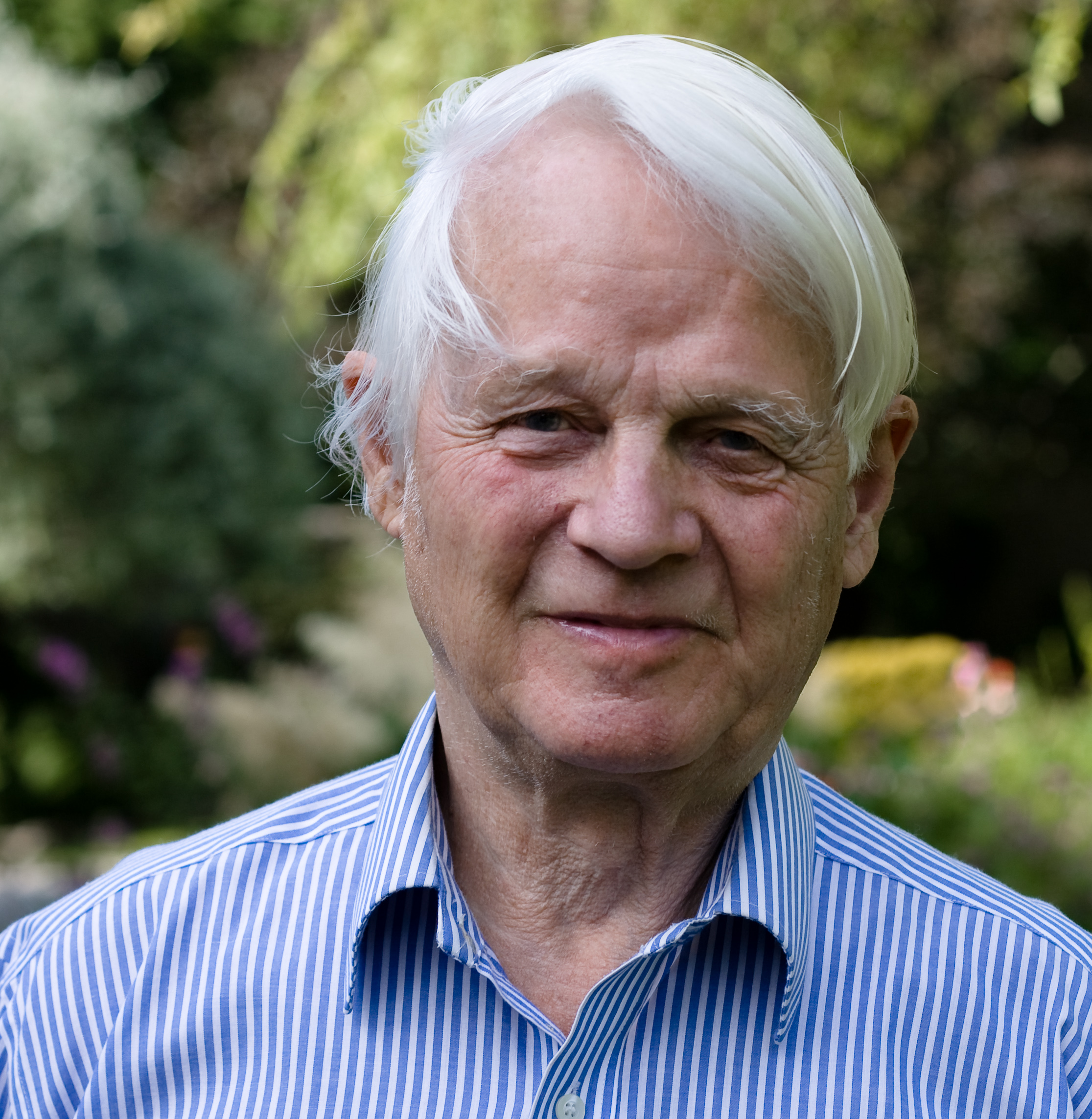
Richard Lynn, the controversial English psychologist who has argued for global group differences in intelligence

From the 1980s onwards, the Pioneer Fund continued to fund hereditarian research on race and intelligence, in particular the two English-born psychologists Richard Lynn of the University of Ulster and J. Philippe Rushton of the University of Western Ontario, who became president of the fund in 2002. Rushton returned to the cranial measurements of the 19th century, using brain size as an extra factor determining intelligence; in collaboration with Jensen, he most recently developed updated arguments for the genetic explanation of race differences in intelligence. Lynn, longtime editor of and contributor to Mankind Quarterly, has concentrated his research in race and intelligence on gathering and tabulating data purporting to show race differences in intelligence across the world. He has also made suggestions about the political implications of his data, including the revival of older theories of eugenics.

Snyderman & Rothman (1987) announced the results of a survey conducted in 1984 on a sample of over a thousand psychologists, sociologists and educationalists in a multiple choice questionnaire, and expanded in 1988 into the book The IQ Controversy, the Media, and Public Policy. The book claimed to document a liberal bias in the media coverage of scientific findings regarding IQ. The survey included the question, "Which of the following best characterizes your opinion of the heritability of black-white differences in IQ?" 661 researchers returned the questionnaire, and of these, 14% declined to answer the question, 24% voted that there was insufficient evidence to give an answer, 1% voted that the gap was purely "due entirely to genetic variation", 15% voted that it "due entirely due to environmental variation" and 45% voted that it was a "product of genetic and environmental variation". Jencks & Phillips (1998) have pointed out that those who replied "both" did not have the opportunity to specify whether genetics played a large role. There has been no agreement amongst psychometricians on the significance of this particular answer. Scientists supporting the hereditarian point of view have seen it as a vindication of their position.

In 1989, Rushton was placed under police investigation by the Attorney General of Ontario, after complaints that he had promoted racism in one of his publications on race differences. In the same year, Linda Gottfredson of the University of Delaware had an extended battle with her university over the legitimacy of grants from the Pioneer Fund, eventually settled in her favour.

Both later responded with an updated version of Henry E. Garrett's "egalitarian dogma", labelling the claim that all races were equal in cognitive ability as an "egalitarian fiction" and a "scientific hoax". Gottfredson (1994) spoke of a "great fraud", a "collective falsehood" and a "scientific lie", citing the findings of Snyderman and Rothman as justification. Rushton (1996) wrote that there was a "taboo on race" in scientific research that had "no parallel ... not the Inquisition, not Stalin, not Hitler". In his 1998 book "The g Factor: The Science of Mental Ability", Jensen reiterated his earlier claims of Neo-Lysenkoism, writing that "The concept of human races [as] a fiction" has various "different sources, none of them scientific", one of them being "Neo-Marxist philosophy", which "excludes consideration of genetic or biological factors ... from any part in explaining behavioral differences amongst humans". In the same year, the evolutionary psychologist Kevin B. MacDonald went much further, reviving Garrett's claim of the "Boas cult" as a Jewish conspiracy, after which "research on racial differences ceased, and the profession completely excluded eugenicists like Madison Grant and Charles Davenport".

In 1994, the debate on race and intelligence was reignited by the publication of the book The Bell Curve: Intelligence and Class Structure in American Life by Richard Herrnstein and Charles Murray. The book was received positively by the media, with prominent coverage in Newsweek, Time, The New York Times and The Wall Street Journal. Although only two chapters of the book were devoted to race differences in intelligence, treated from the same hereditarian standpoint as Jensen's 1969 paper, it nevertheless caused a similar furore in the academic community to Jensen's article. Many critics, including Stephen J. Gould and Leon Kamin, asserted that the book contained unwarranted simplifications and flaws in its analysis; in particular there were criticisms of its reliance on Lynn's estimates of average IQ scores in South Africa, where data had been used selectively, and on Rushton's work on brain size and intelligence, which was controversial and disputed. These criticisms were subsequently presented in books, most notably The Bell Curve Debate (1995), Inequality by Design: Cracking the Bell Curve Myth (1996) and an expanded edition of Gould's The Mismeasure of Man (1996). In 1994 a group of 52 scientists, including Rushton, Lynn, Jensen and Eysenck, were cosignatories of an op-ed article in The Wall Street Journal written by Linda Gottfredson entitled "Mainstream Science on Intelligence". The article, supporting the conclusions of The Bell Curve, was later republished in an expanded version in the journal Intelligence. The editorial included the statements:

Genetics plays a bigger role than environment in creating IQ differences among individuals ... The bell curve for whites is centred roughly around IQ 100; the bell curve for American blacks roughly around 85 ... black 17-year olds perform, on the average, more like white 13-year olds in reading, math and science, with Hispanics in between.

Another early criticism was that Herrnstein and Murray did not submit their work to academic peer review before publication. There were also three books written from the hereditarian point of view: Why race matters: race differences and what they mean (1997) by Michael Levin; The g Factor: The Science of Mental Ability (1998) by Jensen; and Intelligence; a new look by Hans Eysenck. Various other books of collected contributions appeared at the same time, including The black-white test gap (1998) edited by Christopher Jencks and Meredith Phillips, Intelligence, heredity and environment (1997) edited by Robert Sternberg and Elena Grigorenko. A section in IQ and human intelligence (1998) by Nicholas Mackintosh discussed ethnic groups and Race and intelligence: separating science from myth (2002) edited by Jefferson Fish presented further commentary on The Bell Curve by anthropologists, psychologists, sociologists, historians, biologists and statisticians.

In 1999 the same journal Intelligence reprinted as an invited editorial a long article by the attorney Harry F. Weyher Jr. defending the integrity of the Pioneer Fund, of which he was then president and of which several editors, including Gottfredson, Jensen, Lynn and Rushton, were grantees. In 1994 the Pioneer-financed journal Mankind Quarterly, of which Roger Pearson was the manager and pseudonymous contributor, had been described by Charles Lane in a review of The Bell Curve in the New York Review of Books as "a notorious journal of 'racial history' founded, and funded, by men who believe in the genetic superiority of the white race"; he had called the fund and its journal "scientific racism's keepers of the flame." Gottfredson had previously defended the fund in 1989–1990, asserting that Mankind Quarterly was a "multicultural journal" dedicated to "diversity ... as an object of dispassionate study" and that Pearson did not approve of membership of the American Nazi Party. Pearson (1991) had himself defended the fund in his book Race, Intelligence and Bias in Academe.

In response to the debate on The Bell Curve, the American Psychological Association set up a ten-person taskforce, chaired by Ulrich Neisser, to report on the book and its findings. In its report, "Intelligence: Knowns and Unknowns", published in February 1996, the committee made the following comments on race differences in intelligence:

African American IQ scores have long averaged about 15 points below those of Whites, with correspondingly lower scores on academic achievement tests. In recent years the achievement-test gap has narrowed appreciably. It is possible that the IQ-score differential is narrowing as well, but this has not been clearly established. The cause of that differential is not known; it is apparently not due to any simple form of bias in the content or administration of the tests themselves. The Flynn effect shows that environmental factors can produce differences of at least this magnitude, but that effect is mysterious in its own right. Several culturally-based explanations of the Black/White IQ differential have been proposed; some are plausible, but so far none has been conclusively supported. There is even less empirical support for a genetic interpretation. In short, no adequate explanation of the differential between the IQ means of Blacks and Whites is presently available.

Jensen commented:

As I read the APA statement, [...] I didn't feel it was contradicting my position, but rather merely sidestepping it. It seems more evasive of my position than contradictory. The committee did acknowledge the factual status of what I have termed the Spearman Effect, the reality of g, the inadequacy of test bias and socioeconomic status as causal explanations, and many other conclusions that don't differ at all from my own position. [...] Considering that the report was commissioned by the APA, I was surprised it went as far as it did. Viewed in that light, I am not especially displeased by it.

Rushton found himself at the centre of another controversy in 1999 when unsolicited copies of a special abridged version of his 1995 book Race, Evolution and Behavior, aimed at a general readership, were mass mailed to psychologists, sociologists and anthropologists in North American universities. As a result, Transaction Publishers withdrew from publishing the pamphlet, financed by the Pioneer Fund, and issued an apology in the January 2000 edition of the journal Society. In the pamphlet Rushton recounted how black Africans had been seen by outside observers through the centuries as naked, insanitary, impoverished and unintelligent. In modern times he remarked that their average IQ of 70 "is the lowest ever recorded", due to smaller average brain size. He explained these differences in terms of evolutionary history: those that had migrated to colder climates in the north to evolve into whites and Asians had adapted genetically to have more self-control, lower levels of sex hormones, greater intelligence, more complex social structures, and more stable families. He concluded that whites and Asians are more disposed to "invest time and energy in their children rather than the pursuit of sexual thrills. They are 'dads' rather than 'cads.'" J. Philippe Rushton did not distance himself from groups on the far right in the US. He was a regular contributor to the newsletters of American Renaissance and spoke at many of their biennial conferences, in 2006 sharing the platform with Nick Griffin, leader of the British National Party.

=== 2000–present ===
In 2002, Richard Lynn and Tatu Vanhanen published IQ and the Wealth of Nations. Vanhanen claimed "Whereas the average IQ of Finns is 97, in Africa it is between 60 and 70. Differences in intelligence are the most significant factor in explaining poverty." A complaint by Finland's "Ombudsman for Minorities", Mikko Puumalainen, resulted in Vanhanen being considered to be investigated for incitement of "racial hatred" by the Finnish National Bureau of Investigations. In 2004, the police stated they found no reason to suspect he incited racial hatred and decided not to launch an investigation. Several negative reviews of the book have been published in the scholarly literature. Susan Barnett and Wendy M. Williams wrote that "we see an edifice built on layer upon layer of arbitrary assumptions and selective data manipulation. The data on which the entire book is based are of questionable validity and are used in ways that cannot be justified." They also wrote that cross country comparisons are "virtually meaningless." Richardson (2004) argued, citing the Flynn effect as the best evidence, that Lynn has the causal connection backwards and suggested that "the average IQ of a population is simply an index of the size of its middle class, both of which are results of industrial development". The review concludes that "This is not so much science, then, as a social crusade." A review by Michael Palairet criticized the book's methodology, particularly the imprecise estimates of GDP and the fact that IQ data were only available for 81 of the 185 countries studied. Kamin (2006) has also criticized Lynn and Vanhanen's work on methodological grounds. On July 27, 2020, the European Human Behavior and Evolution Association issued a formal statement opposing the utilization of Lynn's national IQ dataset, citing various methodological concerns. They concluded "Any conclusions drawn from analyses which use these data are therefore unsound, and no reliable evolutionary work should be using these data."

In 2005 the journal Psychology, Public Policy and Law of the American Psychological Association (APA) published a review article by Rushton and Jensen, "Thirty Years of Research on Race Differences in Cognitive Ability". The article was followed by a series of responses, some in support, some critical. Psychologist Richard Nisbett later included an amplified version of his critique as part of the book Intelligence and How to Get It: Why Schools and Cultures Count (2009). Rushton and Jensen in 2010 made a point-for-point reply to this and again summarized the hereditarian position in "Race and IQ: A theory-based review of the research in Richard Nisbett's Intelligence and How to Get It".

In 2006, a systematic analysis by James Flynn and William Dickens showed the gap between black and white Americans to have closed dramatically during the period between 1972 and 2002, suggesting that, in their words, the "constancy of the Black-White IQ gap is a myth." They argued that their results refute the possibility of a genetic origin, concluding that "the environment has been responsible" for observed differences. A subsequent review led by Richard Nisbett and co-authored by Flynn, published in 2012, reached a similar conclusion, stating that the weight of evidence presented in all prior research literature shows that group differences in IQ are best understood as environmental in origin.

On the other hand, a 2007 meta-analysis by Rindermann found many of the same groupings and correlations found by Lynn and Vanhanen, with the lowest scores in sub-Saharan Africa, and a correlation of .60 between cognitive skill and GDP per capita. By measuring the relationship between educational data and social well-being over time, this study also performed a causal analysis, finding that nations investing in education leads to increased well-being later on. Hunt (2010, pp. 437–439) considers Rindermann's analysis to be much more reliable than Lynn and Vanhanen's. However, a 2017 systematic review notes that other researchers have dismissed Rindermann's findings on the basis that "the meaning of variables shifts when you aggregate to different levels; a conceptual, methodological point that is well-established in the field of multi-level modelling." In particular, James Flynn writes that "Rindermann's results suggest that different factors lie behind the emergence of g in international comparisons and the emergence of g when we compare the differential performance of individuals. This renders g(l) and g(ID) so unlike that they have little significance in common." Similarly, Martin Brunner and Romain Martin argue that Rindermann's identification of "a common factor underlying measures of intelligence and student achievement on the cross-national level" is methodologically flawed, stating that given "the level of analysis applied . . . this factor cannot be interpreted as general cognitive ability (g). Rather it is an indicator of a nation's prosperity."

In 2007, James D. Watson, Nobel laureate in biology, gave a controversial interview to the Sunday Times Magazine during a book tour in the United Kingdom. Watson stated he was "inherently gloomy about the prospect of Africa" because "all our social policies are based on the fact that their intelligence is the same as ours – whereas all the testing says not really." He also wrote that "there is no firm reason to anticipate that the intellectual capacities of peoples geographically separated in their evolution should prove to have evolved identically. Our wanting to reserve equal powers of reason as some universal heritage of humanity will not be enough to make it so." This resulted in the cancellation of a Royal Society lecture, along with other public engagements, and his suspension from his administrative duties at Cold Spring Harbor Laboratory. He subsequently cancelled the tour and resigned from his position at CSHL, where he had served as either director, president or chancellor since 1968. However, Watson was later appointed chancellor emeritus of CSHL, and, as of 2009, he continued to advise and guide project work at the laboratory.

A 2009 debate in the journal Nature on the question "Should scientists study race and IQ?" involved position papers by Stephen Ceci and Wendy M. Williams arguing "yes" and Steven Rose arguing "no". All agreed that, as Ceci and Williams put it, "There is an emerging consensus about racial and gender equality in genetic determinants of intelligence; most researchers, including ourselves, agree that genes do not explain between-group differences." Subsequent editorials in Nature have affirmed this view, for example the 2017 statement by the editorial board that "the (genuine but closing) gap between the average IQ scores of groups of black and white people in the United States has been falsely attributed to genetic differences between the races."

In a meta-analysis of studies of IQ estimates in Sub-Saharan Africa, Wicherts, Dolan & van der Maas (2010, p. 10) concluded that Lynn and Vanhanen had relied on unsystematic methodology by failing to publish their criteria for including or excluding studies. They found that Lynn and Vanhanen's exclusion of studies had depressed their IQ estimate for sub-Saharan Africa, and that including studies excluded in IQ and Global Inequality resulted in average IQ of 82 for sub-Saharan Africa, lower than the average in Western countries, but higher than Lynn and Vanhanen's estimate of 67. Wicherts at al. conclude that this difference is likely due to sub-Saharan Africa having limited access to modern advances in education, nutrition and health care. A 2010 systematic review by the same research team, along with Jerry S. Carlson, found that compared to American norms, the average IQ of sub-Saharan Africans was about 80. The same review concluded that the Flynn effect had not yet taken hold in sub-Saharan Africa.

Wicherts, Borsboom, and Dolan (2010) argued that studies reporting support for evolutionary theories of intelligence based on national IQ data suffer from multiple fatal methodological flaws. For example, they state that such studies "... assume that the Flynn Effect is either nonexistent or invariant with respect to different regions of the world, that there have been no migrations and climatic changes over the course of evolution, and that there have been no trends over the last century in indicators of reproductive strategies (e.g., declines in fertility and infant mortality)." They also showed that a strong degree of confounding exists between national IQs and current national development status.

In 2016, Rindermann, Becker & Coyle (2016) attempted to replicate the findings of Snyderman & Rothman (1987) by surveying 71 self-identified psychology experts on the causes of international differences in cognitive test scores; only 20% of those invited participated. They found that the experts surveyed ranked education as the most important factor of these differences, with genetics in second place (accounting on average for 15% of the gap, with high variability in estimates among experts) and health, wealth, geography, climate, and politics as the next most important factors. About 90% of experts in the survey believed there was a genetic component to international IQ gaps. The authors emphasized, however, that their study serves as an "opinion instrument" rather than "an indicator of truth." Notably, the study relied on "self-selection of experts," which the authors acknowledge as a limitation, and focused on self-identified experts in psychology rather than genetics.

In 2018, in response to a resurgence of public controversy over race and intelligence, the geneticist and neuroscientist Kevin Mitchell wrote an article in The Guardian that described the idea of genetic IQ differences between races as "inherently and deeply implausible" because it goes against basic principles of population genetics. There he argued, "To end up with systematic genetic differences in intelligence between large, ancient populations, the selective forces driving those differences would need to have been enormous. What's more, those forces would have to have acted across entire continents, with wildly different environments, and have been persistent over tens of thousands of years of tremendous cultural change." Mitchell concluded that, "While genetic variation may help to explain why one person is more intelligent than another, there are unlikely to be stable and systematic genetic differences that make one population more intelligent than the next."

On 24 January 2026, the New York Times reported that a group of fringe researchers with a long history of racist pseudoscience had used deception to access protected NIH data. The group, which included Bryan Pesta, Jordan Lasker, John G. R. Fuerst, and Emil Kirkegaard and was funded in part by the Pioneer Fund, used the data "to produce at least 16 papers purporting to find biological evidence for differences in intelligence between races, ranking ethnicities by I.Q. scores and suggesting Black people earn less because they are not very smart. Mainstream geneticists have rejected their work as biased and unscientific. Yet by relying on genetic and other personal data from the prominent project, known as the Adolescent Brain Cognitive Development Study, the researchers gave their theories an air of analytical rigor." These papers sparked a new wave of online disinformation about race and intelligence. Pesta, the only one of the group to hold a university position, was fired from Cleveland State University because of this scientific misconduct.

== See also ==
- Race and intelligence
- Human intelligence
- Intelligence quotient
- Heritability of IQ
- Eugenics
