= Robert L. Greene =

American psychologist

Robert L. Greene is an American psychologist known for his work on human learning and memory. He has conducted notable experiments on why some lists of words are more memorable.

== Career ==
Greene earned a B.A. from University of Pennsylvania in 1979 and his Ph.D. from Yale University in 1984.

In 1994 he was one of 52 signatories on "Mainstream Science on Intelligence", an editorial written by Linda Gottfredson and published in the Wall Street Journal, which declared the consensus of the signing scholars on issues related to the controversy about intelligence research that followed the publication of the book The Bell Curve.

== Selected bibliography ==
- Greene, Robert L (1992). Human Memory: Paradigms and Paradoxes. Lawrence Erlbaum Associates: ISBN 0-8058-0997-X
- Greene, R.L. (in press). Role of familiarity in recognition. Psychonomic Bulletin & Review. Greene, R.L., Thapar, A., & Westerman, D.L. (1998). Effects of generation on memory for order. Journal of Memory and Language, 38, 255–264.
- Westerman, D.L., & Greene, R.L. (1998). The revelation that the revelation effect is not due to revelation. Journal of Experimental Psychology: Learning, Memory, and Cognition, 24, 377–386.
- Tussing, A.A., & Greene, R.L. (1997). False recognition of associates: How robust is the effect? Psychonomic Bulletin & Review, 4, 572–576.
