= Timothy Z. Keith =

American psychologist

Timothy Zook Keith
- Education: University of North Carolina at Chapel Hill (B.A.); East Carolina University (M.A.); Duke University (Ph.D.)
- Known for: Structural equation modeling; confirmatory factor analysis; research on intelligence and school learning
- Awards: Fellow of the American Psychological Association (1991)
- Scientific career
- Fields: School psychology; intelligence research; quantitative methods
- Workplaces: University of Texas at Austin

Timothy Zook Keith is an American psychologist. His research is focused on the nature and measurement of intelligence, understanding school learning, and on the methodologies of confirmatory factor analysis and structural equation modelling, and he is considered a leading authority on in the use of structural equation modeling and confirmatory factor analysis in school psychology. He has been a Fellow of the American Psychological Association since 1991.

== Career ==
He earned his B.A. in Psychology from the University of North Carolina at Chapel Hill in 1974, his M.A. in School Psychology from East Carolina University in 1978, and his Ph.D. in School Psychology from Duke University in 1982. He taught at University of Iowa from 1982 to 1987, Virginia Polytechnic Institute from 1987 to 1993, Alfred University from 1993 to 2001, and has been at University of Texas, Austin since 2001.

In 1994, he was one of 52 signatories on "Mainstream Science on Intelligence," an editorial written by Linda Gottfredson and published in the Wall Street Journal, which declared the consensus of the signing scholars on issues related to intelligence following the publication of the book The Bell Curve.
