= Robert M. Thorndike =

American psychology professor (born 1943)

Robert M. Thorndike (born March 2, 1943) is an American psychology professor known for several definitive textbooks on research procedures and psychometrics.

He earned his B.A. in psychology from Wesleyan University in 1965 and his Ph.D. from the University of Minnesota in 1970. He has taught at Western Washington University since 1970.

He is a Fellow in the American Psychological Association, Division 5. In 1994 he was one of 52 signatories on "Mainstream Science on Intelligence," an editorial written by Linda Gottfredson and published in the Wall Street Journal, which declared the consensus of the signing scholars on issues related to race and intelligence following the publication of the book The Bell Curve.

He's the son of the American psychologist and scholar Robert L. Thorndike and the grandson of the psychologist and scholar Edward Lee Thorndike.

== Selected bibliography ==
- Cross-Cultural Research Methods. New York: Wiley-Interscience, 1973. pp. 351. (with R.W. Brislin and W.J. Lonner).
- Correlational Procedures for Research. New York: Gardner Press, 1978. pp. 340.
- Data Collection and Analysis: Basic Statistics. New York: Gardner Press, 1982. pp. 478.
- A Century of ability testing. Chicago: The Riverside Publishing Company, 1990. pp. 164. (with D. Lohman).
- Measurement and evaluation in psychology and education (7th ed.). (2005). New York: Macmillan. pp. 608.
- Thorndike, R. M. & Dinnel, D. L. (2001). Introductory statistics for psychology and education. Upper Saddle River, NJ: Prentice Hall.
