= Nadine Lambert =

American psychologist (1926–2006)

- Born: October 21, 1926; Ephraim, Utah, U.S.
- Died: April 26, 2006 (aged 79)
- Education: University of Los Angeles (BA); California State University, Los Angeles (MEd); University of Southern California (PhD)
- Scientific career
- Fields: Applied psychology
- Workplaces: University of California, Berkeley; American Psychological Association

Nadine Murphy Lambert (October 21, 1926 – April 26, 2006) was an American psychologist and educator. She founded the school psychology program at the University of California, Berkeley, created new instruments for school psychology use, and studied the course of children with attention deficit hyperactivity disorder (ADHD). Lambert was a member of the board of directors of the American Psychological Association from 1984 to 1987.

== Biography ==
Lambert was born in Ephraim, Utah, to Rulon and Maude Murphy, and raised in West Hollywood, California. After earning an undergraduate degree in psychology at the University of California, Los Angeles, and a Master of Education at Cal State University Los Angeles, she received a Ph.D. in psychology from the University of Southern California. Her doctoral studies focused on psychometrics.

She began her career as a kindergarten teacher. She later worked as guidance consultant and school psychologist and then as a research consultant with the California Department of Education. In this position, she worked closely with Eli Bower on programs to improve the mental health of students. She joined the University of California, Berkeley, in 1964 as a member of the faculty of the Graduate School of Education and founded the school psychology program there in the same year. The National Institute of Mental Health supported the program for 18 years. Lambert's latest research was on the measurement of adaptive functioning, and on the developmental course of ADHD. A Fellow of the American Psychological Association, she also served on its board of directors (1984–87) and chaired its Board of Educational Affairs from 1992 to 1994. Lambert wrote such instruments in school psychology as the AAMD Adaptive Behavior Scale (1981 and 1993 editions) and the Children's Attention and Adjustment Survey (1992).

Lambert's other writings include "Educational Reform: Challenges for Psychology and Psychologists" in Professional Psychology (1996); "Adolescent Outcomes for Hyperactive Children: Perspectives on General and Specific Patterns of Childhood Risk for Adolescent Educational, Social, and Mental Health Problems" in American Psychologist (1988); "Persistence of Hyperactive Symptoms from Childhood to Adolescence" in the American Journal of Orthopsychiatry (1987); and "Conceptual Foundations for School Psychology: Perspectives from the Development of the School Psychology Program at Berkeley" in Professional School Psychologist (1986). She also edited the volume How Children Learn: Reforming Schools through Learner-Centered Education (1998).

She was involved in several controversies. In 1995, she was one of 52 signatories on "Mainstream Science on Intelligence," an editorial written by Linda Gottfredson and published in The Wall Street Journal, which declared the consensus of the signing scholars on issues related to the controversy about intelligence research that followed the publication of the book The Bell Curve. At the 1998 National Institutes of Health Consensus Conference on AD/HD, she announced the results of a study suggesting that use of Ritalin might contribute to later drug abuse. Of nearly 400 children with ADHD, those treated with Ritalin as children had double the rates of cocaine use and cigarette smoking as young adults, compared to those who had not taken Ritalin in childhood.

She was killed in a car accident on her way to work in 2006.
