= Lyle F. Schoenfeldt =

American business management professor (born 1939)

Lyle Francis Schoenfeldt (born 1939) is an American business management professor best known for a standard textbook on human resources.

== Life and career ==
Schoenfeldt earned his B.A. from Case Western Reserve University, and his M.S. and Ph.D. from Purdue University. He held a position at the University of Georgia and was Director of Early Identification of Management Talent (EIMT) at Rensselaer Polytechnic Institute before joining Texas A&M University in 1981, where he was the Marie B. Oth Professor of Business. He remained there until 1996.

In 1994, he was one of 52 signatories on "Mainstream Science on Intelligence," an editorial written by Linda Gottfredson and published in the Wall Street Journal, which declared the consensus of the signing scholars on issues related to the controversy about intelligence research that followed the publication of the book The Bell Curve.

He has been a professor at the Walker College of Business at Appalachian State University since 1996. He won the Cattell Award of the Division of Industrial and Organizational Psychology at the American Psychological Association.

From June 1, 1996, until February 1, 2006, he and his wife Wanda Hinshaw (a North Carolina native) owned the Mast Farm Inn, a preserved 19th century farm in Valle Crucis, North Carolina that has been listed since 1972 in the National Register of Historic Places.

== Selected bibliography ==
- Cynthia D. Fisher, Lyle F. Schoenfeldt, James B. Shaw. Human Resource Management. Houghton Mifflin Company (6th ed.) ISBN 0-618-52786-9
