= Del Thiessen =

American psychology professor emeritus (born 1932)

Delbert Duane Thiessen is an American psychology professor emeritus whose research focused on evolutionary mechanisms of reproduction and social communication.

== Education ==
Thiessen studied at University of Denver and San Jose State University, completing his Ph.D. in biopsychology at the University of California, Berkeley. He then did research at Scripps Clinic and Research Foundation in La Jolla, California before taking a position at University of Texas at Austin. He is Professor of evolutionary psychology and member of the Institute of Neuroscience. He conducted research on the genetics of alcoholism at Scripps Clinic and Research Foundation in La Jolla, California. He is Fellow of the American Psychological Association and Fellow of the American Association for the Advancement of Science. At the University of Texas he taught Comparative Psychology and investigated animal communication and human biology and behavior. He continues his investigations of human deviant behaviors, writes fiction and non-fiction, and publishes a weekly blog: www.darksideofthebrain.com. His hobbies include exploring history and literature, playing blues harmonica, and enjoying billiards.

== Career ==
- 1960-1961 Public Health Fellow, MF 11, 174, Sponsored by Drs. David a Rodgers and Gerald E. McClearn, Univ. Berkeley
- 1961, Summer Public Health Fellow, Behavior Genetics Jackson Laboratories, Bar Harbor, Maine, Sponsored by Dr. John L. Fuller
- 1961 Public Health Fellow, MF 11,174, Sponsor Dr. Gerald E. McClearn, UC, Berkeley
- 1962 Fellow, Summer Institute in Behavior Genetics, UC, Berkeley
- 1963. Thiessen received his Ph.D. in Physiological Psychology at UC, Berkeley. His graduate studies were sponsored by Gerald McClearn, David Rodgers, Frank Beach, and Peter Marler.
- 1962-1965 Assistant Professor, Section of Medical Psychology, Division of Psychiatry, Scripps Clinic & Research Foundation, La Jolla, CA
- 1964 Instructor, Physiological Psychology, Univ. Calif. Extension, La Jolla
- 1965-1967 Assistant Professor & Assistant Chair, Dept. Psychology, Univ. Texas at Austin
- 1968-1971 Associate Professor, Dept. Psychology, Univ. Texas at Austin
- 1971-2001 Professor, Dept. Psychology, Univ. Texas at Austin
- 2001–Present Professor Emeritus, Dept. Psychology, Univ. Texas at Austin.

== Publications ==
Thiessen published five books on behavior genetics and over 250 articles in animal and human behavior. Publications include about 250 research publication, 200 conference presentations, and a number of books published individually and with a number of professional colleagues. Books published include:

- Manosevitz, M., Lindzey, G., & Thiessen, D.D. (eds), Behavioral Genetics:Method and research. New York: Appleton-Century-Crofts, 1969
- Lindzey, G. & Thiessen, D.D. (eds) Contributions to behavior-genetic analysis:The mouse as a prototype. New York: Appleton-Century-Crofts, 1970
- Thiessen, D.D. Gene organization and behavior. New York: Random House 1972
- Thiessen, D.D. The evolution and biochemistry of aggression. Springfield, Ill., C.C. Thomas, 1976
- Thiessen, D.D. & Yahr, P. The gerbil in behavioral investigations: Mechanisms of territoriality and olfactory communication. Austin: Univ. Texas Press, 1977
- Thiessen, D. Bittersweet Destiny: The Stormy Evolution of Human Behavior. New Brunswick, Transaction Publishers, 1996. Republished as paperback with new preface, 2012
- Thiessen, W. Slip-ups and the Dangerous Mind: Seeing through and living beyond the psychopath. Amazon.com. Create Space, 2012
- Thiessen, D. (Wolf). Psychopaths Rising: Unholy links between civilization and destruction, In Press, Amazon.com. Create Space, 2013
- Thiessen, D. Universal Desires & Fears: The deep history of sociobiology. Gaea Publishing Co (Agave Publishing Co LLC 1997. Republished as Sociobiology Compendium: Aphorisms, Saying, Asides. New Brunswick, Transaction Publishers, 1998
- Thiessen, D. Survival of the Fittest: The Darwinian diet and exercise program. Morgan Printing (Agave Publishing Co LLC), 1998
- Thiessen, W. Night of the Dagger (original Haitian Voodoo artwork by Edouard Wah), Agave Publishers LLC, 2005

== Appointments ==
He is a Fellow of the American Psychological Association, Fellow of the American Association for the Advancement of Science, a member of the American Psychological Society, the National Association of Scholars, Human Behavior and Evolution Society, Southwestern Comparative Psychological Association, the Society for the Study of Social Policies, International Society for Research on Aggression, the European Sociobiological Society, and the Behavior Genetics Association.

In 1969 he received a three-year award by the Russell Sage Foundation to help develop behavior genetic studies at the Center for Behavior Genetics and Evolution at the University of Texas. Beginning in 1970 and lasting approximately 25 years, Thiessen received continuing research support from NIMH to conduct behavior genetic and pheromone research on mice and gerbils. During this period he also served for eight years on NIMH research study committees evaluating research applications for psychological research from NIMH. In 1975 he was awarded research funds from the University Research Institute at the Univ. Texas at Austin. Thiessen is currently Fellow of the American Psychological Association and Fellow of the American Association for the Advancement of Science. His first novel, The Devil's Song, reached the 2011 semi-finals in competition at Amazon.com. A recent publication is Slip-ups and the Dangerous Mind: Seeing Through and Living Beyond the Psychopath (Create Space: Amazon.com. 2012).

== Activities ==
In 1994 he was one of 52 signatories on "Mainstream Science on Intelligence," an editorial written by Linda Gottfredson and published in The Wall Street Journal, which declared the consensus of the signing scholars on issues related to intelligence research following the publication of the book The Bell Curve. Additional Activities:

- Interest in theory building in the principles of genetic and evolutionary roots of survival mechanisms and reproductive strategies with emphasis on sociobiology, communication, and mate selection.
- Studies of contemporary contingencies associated with social dominance and reproduction.
- Perspectives on psychopathic and Machiavellian relations to leadership and deviant behaviors.
- Writing non-fiction and fiction pieces and developing a website and blog: www.darksideofthebrain.com.

== Selected works ==
- Thiessen D (1996). Bittersweet Destiny: The Stormy Evolution of Human Behavior. Transaction Publishers.
