= Jack M. Feldman =

American psychologist

Jack Michael Feldman is an American psychologist best known for his work in industrial and organizational psychology. Feldman earned a Ph.D. in Social Psychology in 1972 from University of Illinois at Urbana-Champaign. He currently teaches at Georgia Institute of Technology.

In 1994 he was one of 52 signatories on "Mainstream Science on Intelligence," an editorial written by Linda Gottfredson and published in the Wall Street Journal, which declared the consensus of the signing scholars on issues related to the controversy about intelligence research that followed the publication of the book The Bell Curve. Feldman is also a gun enthusiast.

== Selected publications ==
- Feldman JM (1981). Beyond attribution theory: Cognitive processes in performance appraisal. Journal of Applied Psychology, 66, 127–148.
- Feldman JM, Lynch JG Jr. (1988). Self-generated validity and other effects of measurement on belief, attitude, intention and behavior. Journal of Applied Psychology, 73, 421–435.
- Feldman, JM (1994). On the synergy between theory and application: Social cognition and performance appraisal. In R.S. Wyer, Jr., and T.K. Srull (Eds.) Handbook of social cognition (2nd ed., Vol. 2). Hillsdale, NJ: Erlbaum.
- Feldman JM (1999). Four questions about human social behavior. In J. Adamopoulos and Y. Kashima (Eds.) Social Psychology and Cultural Context: Essays in Honor of Harry C. Triandis. New York: Sage.
