= Robert Thorndike =

Robert Thorndike may refer to:

- Robert L. Thorndike (1910–1990), American psychologist
- Robert M. Thorndike (born 1943), American psychologist
