= Arvey =

Arvey may refer to:

Surname:

- Jacob Arvey (1895–1977), political leader in the city of Chicago, Illinois
- Richard D. Arvey, American psychology professor
- Verna Arvey (1910–1987), American librettist, pianist and writer

Places:

- Saint-Jean-d'Arvey, commune in the Savoie department in the Rhône-Alpes region in southeastern France
- Verrens-Arvey, commune in the Savoie department in the Rhône-Alpes region in southeastern France
