= David B. Cohen (psychologist) =

American psychologist

- Born: David B. Cohen; 1941; Brooklyn, New York City, U.S.
- Died: 2004 (aged 62–63)
- Education: Columbia University (BA); University of Michigan (PhD)
- Scientific career
- Fields: Clinical psychology, Evolutionary psychology
- Workplaces: University of Texas at Austin

David B. Cohen (1941–2004) was an American psychology professor.

== Biography ==
Born in Brooklyn, Cohen received his bachelor's degree in 1963 from Columbia College of Columbia University, and his doctorate in clinical psychology from University of Michigan in 1968. He went on to teach clinical psychology and individual differences/evolutionary psychology at the University of Texas at Austin.

His early work focused on dreams. His later work examined the biological mechanisms and risk factors in psychopathology. In 1989, he co-authored Psychopathology with Lee Willerman.

Throughout the 1990s, Cohen wrote about the biological and evolutionary influences of depression.

In 1995, he was a signatory of a collective statement titled "Mainstream Science on Intelligence", written by Linda Gottfredson and published in The Wall Street Journal.

Cohen also wrote two books on children for both academic and lay readers, framed by the nature versus nurture debate. In these books, he argued that parental influence over a child's development was much less powerful than biological and evolutionary influences. His work suggests that much parental influence is not only weak or transitory but also illusory.

== Publications ==
- Cohen DB (1999). Stranger in the Nest: Do Parents Really Shape Their Child's Personality, Intelligence, or Character? Wiley ISBN 0-471-31922-8.
- Cohen DB (1995). Out of the Blue: Depression and Human Nature. W.W. Norton & Company; New Ed edition ISBN 0-393-31299-2.
- Cohen DB (1981). Sleep and Dreaming: Origins, Nature and Functions (International Series in Experimental Psychology; V. 23) Pergamon Press. ISBN 0-08-027400-5.
- Cohen DB (2003). Where Did That Child Come From?: Why Some of Our Children Turn Out So Different from Us & What the Answers Reveal About Our Parenting and Ourselves. Templegate. ISBN 0-87243-258-0.
- Willerman L, Cohen DB (1989). Psychopathology. McGraw-Hill College. ISBN 0-07-070311-6.
