= Mainstream Science on Intelligence =

1994 public statement published in the Wall Street Journal

The statement as it appeared in The Wall Street Journal on Tuesday, December 13, 1994

"Mainstream Science on Intelligence" was a public statement issued by a group of researchers led by the psychologist Linda Gottfredson. It was published originally in The Wall Street Journal on December 13, 1994, as a response to criticism of Richard Herrnstein and Charles Murray's book The Bell Curve, which had appeared the same year. The statement defended Herrnstein and Murray's controversial claims about race and intelligence, including the claim that average intelligence quotient (IQ) differences between racial and ethnic groups may be at least partly genetic in origin. This view is now considered discredited by mainstream science.

The statement was drafted by Gottfredsen, a professor of educational psychology at the University of Delaware. It was sent to 131 researchers whom Gottfredsen described as "experts in intelligence and allied fields". Of these, 52 signed the statement, 48 returned the request with an explicit refusal to sign, and 31 ignored the request.

According to a 1996 response by former American Psychological Association president Donald Campbell, only ten of those who signed were actual experts in intelligence measurement. The Southern Poverty Law Center reported that 20 of the signers were recipients of funding from the white supremacist organization the Pioneer Fund, including Gottfredson herself.

During subsequent years, both the substance and the interpretation of this statement have received criticism from scientists.

== Background ==
Gottfredson was prompted to write the statement by what she considered to be "outdated, pseudoscientific notions of intelligence" promoted by critics of The Bell Curve in the controversy that resulted from the publication of the book. She contacted David Brooks of The Wall Street Journal, who was willing to publish a short statement signed by experts describing what he considered mainstream in the study of intelligence. Gottfredson drafted the statement, had it vetted by several researchers, and finally solicited signatures for it from experts in several disciplines, including anthropology, behavior genetics, intellectual disability, neuropsychology, sociology, and various specialties in psychology. The experts invited to sign the statement were not given an opportunity to revise it, nor was anyone told who else had been invited or who had already given his or her signature.

The invitation to sign was sent to 131 researchers, of whom 100 responded by the deadline. The signature form asked whether the respondent would sign the statement, and if not, why not. 48 sent back the request with an explicit refusal to sign and 31 ignored the request. According to Gottfredson, seven of those who explicitly refused to sign did so "because they thought the statement did not represent the mainstream, 11 because they did not know whether it did, and 30 for other reasons". 52 respondents agreed to sign the statement.

== Statement ==
The letter to The Wall Street Journal set out 25 numbered statements it termed "conclusions regarded as mainstream among researchers on intelligence" and "fully described in the major textbooks, professional journals, and encyclopedias in intelligence":

1. "Intelligence is a very general mental capability ... it reflects a broader and deeper capability for comprehending our surroundings ..."
2. "Intelligence, so defined, can be measured, and intelligence tests measure it well. They are among the most accurate (in technical terms, reliable and valid) of all psychological tests and assessments."
3. "While there are different types of intelligence tests, they all measure the same intelligence."
4. "The spread of people along the IQ continuum ... can be represented well by the ... 'normal curve'."
5. "Intelligence tests are not culturally biased".
6. "The brain processes underlying intelligence are still little understood".
7. "Members of all racial-ethnic groups can be found at every IQ level...The bell curves for some groups (Jews and East Asians) are centered somewhat higher than for whites in general. Other groups (blacks and Hispanics) are centered somewhat lower than non-Hispanic whites."
8. "The bell curve for whites is centered roughly around IQ 100; the bell curve for American blacks roughly around 85; and those for different subgroups of Hispanics roughly midway between those for whites and blacks. The evidence is less definitive for exactly where above IQ 100 the bell curves for Jews and Asians are centered".
9. "IQ is strongly related, probably more so than any other single measurable human trait, to many important educational, occupational, economic, and social outcomes ... Whatever IQ tests measure, it is of great practical and social importance".
10. "A high IQ is an advantage because virtually all activities require some reasoning and decision-making".
11. "The practical advantages of having a higher IQ increase as life's settings become more complex".
12. "Differences in intelligence certainly are not the only factor affecting performance in education, training, and complex jobs ... but intelligence is often the most important".
13. "Certain personality traits, special talents, [etc] are important ... in many jobs, but they have narrower (or unknown) applicability or 'transferability' across tasks and settings compared with general intelligence".
14. "Heritability estimates range from 0.4 to 0.8 ... indicating genetics plays a bigger role than environment in creating IQ differences".
15. "Members of the same family also tend to differ substantially in intelligence".
16. "That IQ may be highly heritable does not mean that it is not affected by the environment ... IQs do gradually stabilize during childhood, however, and generally change little thereafter".
17. "Although the environment is important in creating IQ differences, we do not know yet how to manipulate it".
18. "Genetically caused differences are not necessarily irremediable".
19. "There is no persuasive evidence that the IQ bell curves for different racial-ethnic groups are converging".
20. "Racial-ethnic differences in IQ bell curves are essentially the same when youngsters leave high school as when they enter first grade ... black 17-year-olds perform, on the average, more like white 13-year-olds".
21. "The reasons that blacks differ among themselves in intelligence appear to be the same as those for why whites ... differ among themselves".
22. "There is no definitive answer as to why bell curves differ across racial-ethnic groups. The reasons for these IQ differences between groups may be markedly different from the reasons for why individuals differ among themselves within any particular group".
23. "Racial-ethnic differences are somewhat smaller but still substantial for individuals from the same socio-economic backgrounds".
24. "Almost all Americans who identify themselves as black have white ancestors – the white admixture is about 20% ... research on intelligence relies on self-classification into distinct racial categories".
25. "The research findings neither dictate nor preclude any particular social policy, because they can never determine our goals. They can, however, help us estimate the likely success and side-effects of pursuing those goals via different means".

== Response and criticism ==
A 1995 article by Joseph L. Graves & Amanda Johnson was critical of the scientific basis on which Mainstream Science on Intelligence rested. The article stated that the statements in Mainstream Science on Intelligence

"...certainly fall in line with general Euro-American impressions of race and intelligence. The problem, however, is that none of the ideas these psychometricians support have any relation to legitimate scientific inference. Even though individuals like psychologist J. Philippe Rushton have published monumental treatises to support the claim of Nordic racial superiority, and despite the flamboyant approaches of Shockley, Jensen, Herrnstein, and Murray, there remain only two ways the psychometric syllogism can be deemed acceptable-- either: (a) one has little or no knowledge of the broad areas of the scientific method, statistical reasoning, population studies, quantitative genetics, developmental physiology, neurophysiology, environmental toxicology, sociology, educational psychology, economics, and history required to adequately comprehend the issues involved; or (b) one has no desire to examine the facts of this problem objectively.

In a posthumous article in 1996, Donald T. Campbell, a former president of the American Psychological Association, included his own analysis of the Wall Street Journal statement, drafted previously as a letter to that newspaper. Campbell first remarked that "Of the 52 signatories, there were 10 whom I would regard as measurement experts. I do not have a list of those who were asked to sign and refused, but I know they included Lee Cronbach, Robert Sternberg, and myself."

He went on to say that the rhetorical organization of statements in the letter seemed to him to imply, inadvertently or deliberately, the conclusion that the black-white racial gap had a genetic cause. He said that for statement 5, no provision had been allowed for differences in educational opportunity. Later on regarding statement 14, he judged that the claims for heritability had been made without mentioning that it was based on twin studies, where environmental opportunities had been excluded as possible factors. For statement 23, he said that it was not possible to compare children of black and white parents that were "equally" educated, because in these circumstances the opportunities in the quality of education, both before and at college, would differ. For statement 25, Campbell remarked that Jensen had himself published policy recommendations concerning rote learning.

As Hauser (2010) reports in his discussion of the editorial, there is not any general agreement about what is meant by intelligence. The editorial gave the following general definition of intelligence:

Intelligence is a very general mental capability that, among other things, involves the ability to reason, plan, solve problems, think abstractly, comprehend complex ideas, learn quickly, and learn from experience. It is not merely book-learning, a narrow academic skill, or test-taking smarts. Rather, it reflects a broader and deeper capability for comprehending our surroundings "catching on," "making sense" of things, or "figuring out" what to do.

Gottfredson (1997b) describes intelligence in her own article in the same volume less broadly as "the ability to deal with complexity". However, the article by Carroll (1997a), one of the signatories of the statement, reviewed the numerous attempts in the academic literature to define what was meant by intelligence and found that there was not any agreement. He cites experts as describing intelligence as "the total intellectual repertoire of behavioral responses," "some general property or quality ... of the brain," "reaction-time and physiological measures," "many different information-processing abilities" and "the rate with which learning occurs or the time required for learning." Plomin & Petrill (1997c) in the same volume describe intelligence as what is measured by intelligence tests: "What we mean by intelligence is general cognitive functioning (g) as assessed in the psychometric tradition of a general factor derived from a battery of diverse cognitive ability tests".

Harrington (1997) gives a point-by-point analysis of the conclusions of the letter. He states that the validity of tests is claimed as a property of the tests, rather than how or where they are used. He questioned the letter's claims about there not being any cultural bias in IQ tests; and that intelligence was a major factor determining fitness in human evolution, something that he argued was inconsistent with the claims of heritability, if the geneticist's version of evolution was being used. Harrington argued that heritability is phylogenetic, not ontogenetic as the letter suggested. He pointed out that the use of the term "race" differed from the way geneticists classify population groups. Regarding the assertion that IQ research does not preclude or dictate any particular social policy, Harrington commented that the opinions of Charles Murray concerning social policy have been used by US Congressmen to argue for policy changes.

The validity of the "mainstream science" described in the editorial was also questioned by Belkhir & Duyme (1998), who argued that the signatories were attempting to revive the "pseudo-scientific inquiry" of biological determinism.

In a 2001 article in Trends in Cognitive Sciences, Ian J. Deary noted that The Wall Street Journal "... is an odd place for such a document, and readers might view the signatories as one-sided, largely committed to the psychometrics-based intelligence research they were endorsing".

Alderfer (2003) analysed the editorial as one of five responses to The Bell Curve, a book which he described as "an attempt to influence both psychological knowledge and U.S. politics". He concluded that some of the responses, including the editorial, "fell far short of providing a critical analysis of the book's racially biased argument and did little to reduce the misleading picture of race and IQ that the book promulgated". More specifically, Alderfer criticized the failure of the psychologists to recognize the effect of such a book on race relations in the US; as well as their failure to discuss the third and last part of the book on the implications for social policy. He wrote that,

"Some psychologists said they wanted to keep themselves out of the emotional turmoil that had been generated by publication of the Bell Curve ... They might also have wanted to preserve the neutrality of psychology as a science. When examined in the contemporary racial context, however, their action was neither scientifically nor politically neutral. Essentially, they took a stand by not taking a stand. Their stand was not to become involved in how their expertise might be used to affect people's lives ...they missed an opportunity to caution their readers about regressive forces affecting U.S. race relations and to locate the book within that context. They did not fully use the authority based on their expertise to prevent harm."

Schlinger (2003) argued:

"With a few exceptions, the list of cosigners reads like a Who's Who of those theorists (e.g., Thomas J. Bouchard, Jr., John B. Carroll, Raymond B. Cattell, Hans Eysenck, Linda S. Gottfredson, Seymour W. Itzkoff, Arthur R. Jensen, Robert Plomin, J. Philippe Rushton and Vincent Sarich) who have continued Spearman's tradition of factor analyzing intelligence test scores to generate a theory of general intelligence — g — and some of whom (e.g., Thomas J. Bouchard, Robert Plomin) believe that behavior genetic research supports the conclusion that g is highly heritable, and others of whom (e.g., Arthur Jensen, J. Philippe Rushton, Seymour Itzkoff) have written highly emotionally charged articles arguing that the research supports the conclusion that group differences on intelligence tests reflect genetic differences."

Armour-Thomas (2003) argued that the statement's claim that IQ tests were unbiased is not accepted by some prominent researchers of psychometrics who have described problems with using tests on population groups with a substantively different cultural background from those for whom the test was originally designed.

Anthropologist Robert Wald Sussman criticized the statement in his 2014 book The Myth of Race, writing:

"In this letter, the members of the new bigot brigade claimed that since as many as fifty-two scientists signed this letter, the contents of the book [i.e. the Bell Curve] and of the letter must be true. Using this logic, since the vast majority of anthropologists and other social scientists and of geneticists do not agree with the conclusions of this volume, does that mean it must be false? Obviously not. However, it is the actual science that began with Boas and his colleagues and that has continued to this date that makes these authors' beliefs and approach untenable at any level."

The Southern Poverty Law Center states that some of the editorial's signatories "...had no relevant qualifications at all. Garrett Hardin, for example, was an ecologist and anti-immigration activist, while Vincent Sarich was an anthropologist who gained notoriety for making racist and homophobic claims in his undergraduate courses (he later admitted to The New York Times that these assertions were not based on established scientific facts)." After citing Campbell's estimate that only 10 signatories were experts on the measurement of intelligence, the Center noted that "...at least 20 [signatories] were recipients of money from the Pioneer Fund, including one director of the Fund, R. Travis Osborne, and two future presidents, J. Philippe Rushton and Richard Lynn."

In a 2015 interview, behavior geneticist Robert Plomin was asked whether he regretted signing the statement. He reiterated his support for the factual assertions in the letter, but rejected interpretations of that data in The Bell Curve:

"Well, I regret it to the extent it's a distraction to my research. But I think the basic facts are there...erm, about heritability of intelligence, and it's just so unfortunate that some of the interpretations [Murray and Herrnstein] made from that data are so, you know, some of them are quite bizarre and I would make just the opposite sorts of interpretations."

== Signatories ==
- Richard D. Arvey, University of Minnesota
- Thomas J. Bouchard, Jr., University of Minnesota
- John B. Carroll, University of North Carolina at Chapel Hill
- Raymond B. Cattell, University of Hawaii
- David B. Cohen, University of Texas at Austin
- Rene V. Dawis, University of Minnesota
- Douglas K. Detterman, Case Western Reserve University
- Marvin Dunnette, University of Minnesota
- Hans Eysenck, University of London
- Jack M. Feldman, Georgia Institute of Technology
- Edwin A. Fleishman, George Mason University
- Grover C. Gilmore, Case Western Reserve University
- Robert A. Gordon, Johns Hopkins University
- Linda S. Gottfredson, University of Delaware
- Robert L. Greene, Case Western Reserve University
- Richard J. Haier, University of California, Irvine
- Garrett Hardin, University of California, Santa Barbara
- Robert Hogan, University of Tulsa
- Joseph M. Horn, University of Texas at Austin
- Lloyd G. Humphreys, University of Illinois at Urbana–Champaign
- John E. Hunter, Michigan State University
- Seymour W. Itzkoff, Smith College
- Douglas N. Jackson, University of Western Ontario
- James J. Jenkins, University of South Florida
- Arthur R. Jensen, University of California, Berkeley
- Alan S. Kaufman, University of Alabama
- Nadeen L. Kaufman, California School of Professional Psychology at San Diego
- Timothy Z. Keith, Alfred University
- Nadine Lambert, University of California, Berkeley
- John C. Loehlin, University of Texas at Austin
- David Lubinski, Iowa State University
- David T. Lykken, University of Minnesota
- Richard Lynn, University of Ulster at Coleraine
- Paul E. Meehl, University of Minnesota
- R. Travis Osborne, University of Georgia
- Robert Perloff, University of Pittsburgh
- Robert Plomin, Institute of Psychiatry, London
- Cecil R. Reynolds, Texas A&M University
- David C. Rowe, University of Arizona
- J. Philippe Rushton, psychologist, University of Western Ontario
- Vincent Sarich, University of Auckland New Zealand
- Sandra Scarr, University of Virginia
- Frank L. Schmidt, University of Iowa
- Lyle F. Schoenfeldt, Texas A&M University
- James C. Sharf, George Washington University
- Herman Spitz, former director E.R. Johnstone Training and Research Center, Bordentown, N.J.
- Julian C. Stanley, Johns Hopkins University
- Del Thiessen, University of Texas at Austin
- Lee A. Thompson, Case Western Reserve University
- Robert M. Thorndike, Western Washington University
- Philip Anthony Vernon, University of Western Ontario
- Lee Willerman, University of Texas at Austin

== See also ==
- History of the race and intelligence controversy
- Snyderman and Rothman (study)
- The Bell Curve Debate
- Intelligence: Knowns and Unknowns
- Intelligence and How to Get It
- Superior: The Return of Race Science
