= R. Travis Osborne =

American psychologist (1913–2013)

- Born: Robert Travis Osborne; October 20, 1913; Cocoa, Florida, U.S.
- Died: May 28, 2013 (aged 99); Athens, Georgia, U.S.
- Known for: Director of the Pioneer Fund
- Scientific career
- Fields: Psychology
- Workplaces: University of Georgia

Robert Travis Osborne (October 20, 1913 – May 28, 2013) was an American psychologist. He was professor emeritus of psychology at University of Georgia, and director of the Pioneer Fund, an organization prominently described as white supremacist in nature, from 2000 until his death.

== Biography ==
Osborne began at University of Georgia in 1946 and was appointed director of the university's Counseling and Testing Center in 1947. He was interested in psychometrics and counseling. When licensing laws for psychologists in Georgia were enacted, his license was number 15.

Osborne is a grantee of the Pioneer Fund to study intelligence and personality as well as physical characteristics in several hundred white and black twins in Georgia, Kentucky, and Indiana. Osborne's large twin study showed that the weight of genes and culture are equally important among Blacks as among Whites. During the civil rights movement, he testified in court against school integration.

In 1994 he was one of 52 signatories of Mainstream Science on Intelligence, a public statement written by Linda Gottfredson and published in the Wall Street Journal as a response to what the authors viewed as the inaccurate and misleading reports made by the media regarding academic consensus on the results of intelligence research in the wake of the appearance of The Bell Curve earlier the same year.

Osborne became a Director of the Pioneer Fund in 2000 and continued in that role until his death at the age of 99 in 2013.

== Bibliography ==
- Osborne, R. Travis, A. James Gregor, and Frank Miele. "Heritability of Numerical Facility." Perceptual and Motor Skills 24 (1967): 659–666.
- Osborne, R. Travis, A. James Gregor, and Frank Miele. "Heritability of Factor V: Verbal Comprehension." Perceptual and Motor Skills 26 (1968): 191–202.
- Osborne, R. Travis, and Frank Miele. "Racial Differences in Environmental Influences on Numerical Ability as Determined by Heritability Estimates." Perceptual and Motor Skills 28 (1969): 535–538.
- Miele, Frank, and R. Travis Osborne. "Racial Differences in Heritability Ratios for Verbal Ability." Homo 24 (1973): 35–39.
- Swan, Donald A., and Frank Miele (with the assistance of Dr. R. Travis Osborne). "A Factor Analysis of Oetteking's Ancient Egyptian Cranial Data." Homo 24 (1973): 188–204.
- R Travis Osborne & Frank C.J. McGurk, The Testing of Negro Intelligence, vol. 2, Athens, GA: Foundation for Human Understanding, 1982
- Osborne, R. Travis, Clyde E. Noble, and Nathaniel Weyl, editors. Human Variation. Orlando: Academic Press, 1978.
- Osborne, R. Travis. Twins: Black and White. Athens, Georgia: Foundation for Human Understanding, 1980.
