= Richard D. Arvey =

American psychologist

Richard David Arvey
- Born: United States
- Education: Occidental College (BA); University of Minnesota (MA, PhD)
- Scientific career
- Workplaces: National University of Singapore

Richard D. Arvey is an American psychology professor.

== Biography ==
Arvey received a Bachelor of Arts degree in psychology in 1966 from Occidental College. He then attended University of Minnesota to study industrial psychology, earning a master's degree in 1968 and a doctorate in 1970.

Arvey has studied and consulted on issues involving employee selection, which helped him develop physical ability tests for selecting police and firefighter recruits for the City of Minneapolis. He also investigates the genetic influences of work behavior, such as job satisfaction and leadership, based on data from the Minnesota Twin Registry. In one study, Arvey et al. found that approximately 30% of the variance in leadership is genetically influenced while environmental factors contribute to the remaining differences.

He has researched factors determining work continuance in lottery winners and found that people who won more money and people who thought work was more important in a person's life were more likely to continue working.

In 1995, he was a signatory of a collective statement in response to The Bell Curve titled Mainstream Science on Intelligence, written by Intelligence editor Linda Gottfredson and published in the Wall Street Journal.

He currently teaches MBA Students and guides Research Candidates at the National University of Singapore (NUS) Business School in Singapore.

== Publications ==
- Arvey RD. Fairness in Selecting Employees, Addison-Wesley, 1979; revised ed., 1988. ISBN 0-201-00070-9
- Arvey RD, Jockin V, McGue M. Perceived victimization moderates self-reports of workplace aggression and conflict. Journal of Applied Psychology
- Arvey RD, Liao H, Butler R. Prediction of work injury frequency and duration among firefighters. Journal of Occupational Health Psychology 2001.
- Arvey RD, Campion J. Being there: Writing the highly cited article. Personnel Psychology, 1999.
- Arvey RD, McCall B, Cavanaugh M. Genetic influences on job and occupational switching. Journal of Vocational Behavior, 1997.
- Arvey RD, Yang H, Sackett P. Statistical power and costs in training evaluation: Some new considerations. Personnel Psychology.
- Arvey RD, Cole D, Maxwell S, Salas E. How the power of MANOVA can both increase and decrease as a function of the intercorrelations among the dependent variable. Psychological Bulletin, 1994.
- Arvey RD, Landon T, Nutting S, Maxwell S. The Development of Physical Ability Tests for Police Officers: a construct validation approach. Journal of Applied Psychology, 1992.
- Arvey RD, Bouchard T, Segal N, Abraham L. Job Satisfaction: Environmental and Genetic Components. Journal of Applied Psychology, 1992.
- Arvey RD, Campion J. The Employment Interview: A Summary and Review of Recent Research. Personnel Psychology, 1982.
- Arvey RD, Ivancevich J. Punishment in Organizations: A Review, Propositions and Research Suggestions. Academy of Management Review, 1980.
- Colarelli, S. M. & Arvey, R.A. (Eds.) (2015). Biological Foundations of Organizational Behavior. Chicago: University of Chicago Press.
