= Franz Samelson =

German-American social psychologist and historian

- Born: September 23, 1923; Breslau, German Reich
- Died: March 16, 2015 (aged 91); Manhattan, Kansas, U.S.
- Citizenship: United States
- Education: Ludwig-Maximilians-Universität München; University of Michigan
- Known for: Work on the history of psychology
- Spouse: Phoebe Samelson (m. 1955–2015)
- Children: Karen Samelson
- Scientific career
- Fields: Social psychology
- Workplaces: Kansas State University
- Thesis: Group pressure and incongruity in the cognitive field as determinants of conformity (1956)

Franz Samelson (September 23, 1923 – March 16, 2015) was a German-American social psychologist and historian of psychology.

Samelson was born on September 23, 1923, in Breslau, German Reich (today Wrocław, Poland). Prohibited by the laws of Nazi Germany from attending any German universities, he instead attended a photography school in Munich, where he later worked in a factory with prisoners of war. After World War II ended, he began working for the United States Army. He also enrolled at the Ludwig-Maximilians-Universität München, where he received a diploma in psychology in 1952.

In 1952, he immigrated to the United States, following his older brother Hans. He went on to receive his Ph.D. in psychology from the University of Michigan in 1956. He joined the faculty of Kansas State University in 1957, where he remained until retiring as Professor in 1990.

Samelson died on March 16, 2015, in Manhattan, Kansas.
