= Robert A. Gordon =

American sociologist (born 1932)

Robert A. Gordon (born August 10, 1932) is an American sociologist best known for his work on intelligence, criminality, and race.

== Biography ==
Born in New York City, he served in the United States Army from 1955 to 1957. Gordon earned his B.A. from the College of the City of New York in 1957, then attended the University of Chicago, earning his M.A. in 1961 and his Ph.D. in 1963. That year, he began teaching at Johns Hopkins University, until retiring in 2005.

He was the second husband of Linda Gottfredson, and one of 52 signatories on "Mainstream Science on Intelligence," a public statement written by Gottfredson, published in response to popular criticism of the conclusions presented in the controversial book The Bell Curve. He has also criticized a 1994 ABC news report on the Pioneer Fund in an extensive commentary. Gordon and Gottfredson have both received money from the controversial fund. In an interview Gordon stated in response to the question "Do you think that people with low IQs should be paid to be sterilized?" replied:

I think that's a rather shocking proposal! I would prefer not paying people. [Laughter] I do think that if we could persuade people with lower IQs not to have as many children as they are having, there would be obvious benefits. As far as black people are concerned, I don't know. If they care about the future of their race, they might be willing to go to some trouble to accomplish that. I think it's right to give them the proper information in order for them to do that.

== Selected works ==
- Gordon, Robert A. (1997). "Everyday life as an intelligence test: Effects of intelligence and intelligence context". Intelligence. 24 (1): 203–320. doi:10.1016/S0160-2896(97)90017-9. ISSN 0160-2896.
