= Wendy M. Williams =

Wendy M. Williams (born 1960) is a psychologist and professor known for her research in the fields of intelligence with regard to training and development. Williams is a professor at Cornell University in their Department of Human Development. Williams is also the founder of the Cornell Institute for Women in Science (CIWS), a center with the intended purpose for studying and promoting women in science. Working alongside the National Science Foundation, Williams leads the "Thinking Like a Scientist" program, which intends to diversify the science community by getting girls and other underrepresented groups interested.

== Biography ==
Williams attained her B.A. in English and Biology at Columbia University in 1982. In 1985, Williams achieved her masters at Yale University in psychology. While at Yale, Williams also obtained an M.Phil. in 1986 in the field of physical anthropology and her Ph.D. in 1991 in psychology. Williams currently works at the Cornell Institute for Women in Science, which she founded in 2009 and currently directs. She is a professor in the department of human development and specializes in intelligence.

Alongside Stephen Ceci, she has written and published many articles, as well as has authored nine personal books, including The Reluctant Reader, How to Develop Student Creativity, and The Mathematics of Sex. Williams has also edited five volumes and has had the results of her research cited in several psychology textbooks.

Williams is currently a member of the Association for Psychological Science (APS), as well as the American Psychological Association (APA) in the fields of general psychology, developmental psychology, educational psychology, and media psychology. While a member of the APA, Williams served as acting Member-at-Large for the Division 1 general psychology committee for two terms.

Williams leads the "Thinking Like a Scientist" program that was started at Cornell University, which serves to deepen common understanding of science and spark interest in underrepresented children. Unlike ordinary science courses, Williams's objective is not to have students understand vocabulary and terms in a compartmentalized manner, but to think scientifically in a real life manner.

Williams has received many awards and considerations over the course of her career. Williams has achieved the Senior Investigator Awards for Excellence in Research from the Mensa Foundation in 1997, 1999, and 2002. She won the Early Career Contribution Award from the APA in 1996, and the 2001 Robert Fantz Award for an Early Career Contribution to Psychology. In 2014, Williams won second place in the National Institutes of Health "Great Idea" Challenge. Her submission for the challenge was her research proposal regarding the role of gender and race in the grant-reviewing process.

Williams is a contributor for the New York Times as well as the Huffington Post, mostly with regard to sexuality having an influence on the scientific community.

== Research ==
Williams is best known for her research in the field of intelligence. Williams focuses not only on what the subjects of her research are thinking about, but also how they are thinking about the world around them. Williams also focuses heavily on the importance of sex and gender in the scientific community, which is expressed in many of her articles on The New York Times and Huffington Post. In an article by Wired, Williams and Ceci's work on the debunking of sexual discrimination in the scientific community is referenced often to explain just why it is so hard for women to get jobs and grants.

In The Mathematics of Sex, Williams and Ceci attempt to understand why women make up a minority of the scientists within the mathematics community. In doing so, they take the three leading theories: male brains are better physically at understanding and performing advanced mathematical and spatial operations; the second being social and cultural biases prevent the training and success of women in mathematical fields; the third claims that women are not as interested in mathematic careers as men. Through the use of multiple fields of research from economics to endocrinology, Williams and Ceci discover that the reason women are not as able to enter the mathematics field is because of a complex series of life choices made that differ between women and men.

Williams also conducted research on the Halo Effect, with regard to whether students judged a teacher as good or not. Through her research, Williams learned that students often praised their professors for things outside of just teaching well; instead, students would acknowledge the equipment used or the legibility of the teachers' handwriting. These factors would then cause the students to get a false impression of their teacher, believing the instructor was good on these bases rather than how they would teach or what they would teach.

== Representative Publications ==
- Ceci, S. J., Williams, W. M., & Barnett, S. M. (2009). Women's underrepresentation in science: sociocultural and biological considerations. Psychological Bulletin, 135(2), 218-261.
- Ceci, S. J., & Williams, W. M. (2011). Understanding current causes of women's underrepresentation in science. Proceedings of the National Academy of Sciences, 108(8), 3157-3162.
- Ceci, S. J., & Williams, W. M. (1997). Schooling, Intelligence, and Income. American Psychologist, 52(10), 1051-1058.
- Sternberg, R. J., Wagner, R. K., Williams, W. M., & Horvath, J. A. (1995). Testing Common Sense. American Psychologist, 50(11), 912-927.
- Williams, W. W. (1984). Equality's riddle: Pregnancy and the equal treatment/special treatment debate. NYU Rev. L. & Soc. Change, 13, 325.
- Williams, W. M., & Ceci, S. J. (1997). “How'm I doing?” Problems with student ratings of instructors and courses. Change: The Magazine of Higher Learning, 29(5), 12-23.
