= Linda Gottfredson =

American psychologist and writer (born 1947)

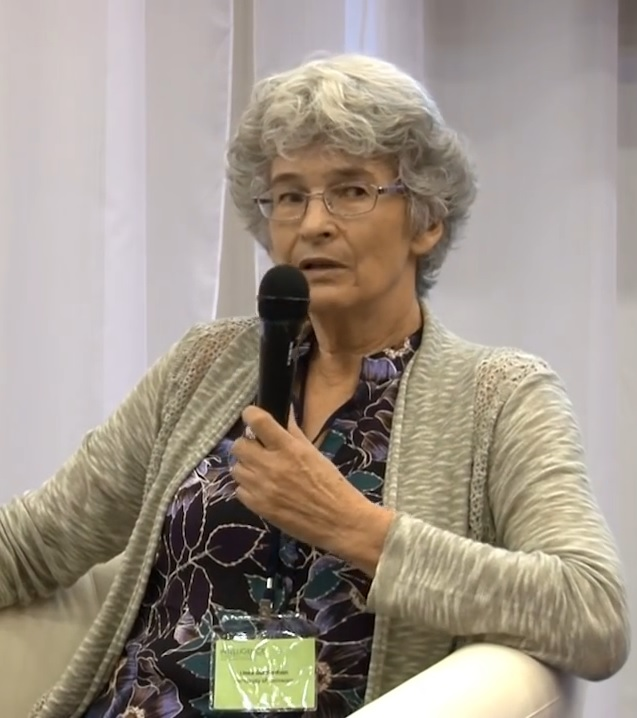
- Gottfredson interviewed in 2016
- Born: Linda Susanne Howarth; 1947 (age 78–79); San Francisco, California, U.S.
- Education: University of California, Berkeley (BS); Johns Hopkins University (PhD)
- Known for: Mainstream Science on Intelligence
- Scientific career
- Fields: Educational psychology Psychometry
- Workplaces: University of Delaware, editorial boards of Intelligence, Learning and Individual Differences, and Society
- Thesis: The relation of situs of work to occupational achievement (1977)

Linda Susanne Gottfredson (née Howarth; born 1947) is an American psychologist and writer. She is professor emerita of educational psychology at the University of Delaware and co-director of the Delaware-Johns Hopkins Project for the Study of Intelligence and Society. She is best known for writing the 1994 letter "Mainstream Science on Intelligence", which was published in the Wall Street Journal in defense of Richard Herrnstein and Charles Murray's controversial book The Bell Curve (1994).

She is on the boards of the International Society for the Study of Individual Differences, the International Society for Intelligence Research, and the editorial boards of the academic journals Intelligence, Learning and Individual Differences, and Society.

== Life and education ==
Gottfredson was born in San Francisco in 1947. She is a third generation university faculty member. Her father, Jack A. Howarth (died 2006), was a faculty member at U.C. Davis School of Veterinary Medicine, as was his father. Gottfredson initially majored in biology, but later transferred to psychology with her first husband, Gary Don Gottfredson. In 1969, she received a bachelor's degree in psychology from University of California, Berkeley. She worked in the Peace Corps in Malaysia. Gottfredson and her husband went to graduate school at Johns Hopkins University, where she received a Ph.D. in sociology in 1977.

== Academic work ==
Gottfredson took a position at Hopkins' Center for Social Organization of Schools and investigated issues of occupational segregation and typology based on skill sets and intellectual capacity. She married Robert A. Gordon, who worked in a related area at Hopkins, and they divorced by the mid-1990s.

In 1985, Gottfredson participated in a conference called "The g Factor in Employment Testing". The papers presented were published in the December 1986 issue of the Journal of Vocational Behavior, which she edited. In 1986, Gottfredson was appointed associate professor of Educational Studies at the University of Delaware, Newark.

In 1989, The Washington Post reported that one of Gottfredson's presentations was cited favorably by an article in the National Association for the Advancement of White People's magazine.

That year, she presented a series of papers on general intelligence factor and employment, including some criticizing the use of different curves for candidates of different races. Gottfredson has said:

We now have out there what I call the egalitarian fiction that all groups are equal in intelligence. We have social policy based on that fiction. For example, the 1991 Civil Rights Act codified Griggs vs. Duke Power, which said that if you have disproportionate hiring by race, you are prima facie -- that's prima facie evidence of racial discrimination. ...Differences in intelligence have real world effects, whether we think they're there or not, whether we want to wish them away or not. And we don't do anybody any good, certainly not the low-IQ people, by denying that those problems exist.

While an assistant professor of Educational Studies in the late 1980s, Gottfredson applied for and received three grants from the Pioneer Fund, which was created to promote scientific racism and eugenics, and which many scholars continue to view as openly white supremacist in nature. She was promoted to full professor at the University of Delaware in 1990. That year, her fourth grant application to the Pioneer Fund was rejected by the board of the university, which said the funding would undermine their university's policy of affirmative action. Gottfredson challenged the ruling with assistance from the Center for Individual Rights and the American Association of University Professors. In 1992, after two and a half years of debate and protest, the university administration reached a settlement that once again allowed Gottfredson and Jan Blits to continue receiving research funding from the Pioneer Fund. The arbitrator of the case held that the university's research committee had violated its own standards of review by looking at the content of Gottfredson's research and that Gottfredson had a right to academic freedom that public perceptions alone did not suffice to overcome.

== Views and criticisms ==
Gottfredson has been very critical of psychologist Robert Sternberg's work on the triarchic theory of intelligence, arguing that Sternberg has not demonstrated a distinction between practical intelligence and the analytical intelligence measured by IQ tests.

Gottfredson has received research grants worth $267,000 from the Pioneer Fund, an organization described as racist and white supremacist. She has defended the work of J. Philippe Rushton, who served as president of the Pioneer Fund and whose research focused on a purported genetic link between race and intelligence. The University of Delaware unsuccessfully sought to block Gottfredson from receiving Pioneer Fund grants before reaching a legal settlement with her in 1992.

Her views on the relationship between race and intelligence and her vocal opposition to policies such as affirmative action, hiring quotas, and "race-norming" on aptitude tests, as well as her funding by the Pioneer Fund, have led the Southern Poverty Law Center to describe her as a promoter of eugenics, scientific racism, and white nationalism.

== Honors ==
- George A Miller Award (for outstanding journal article across specialty areas), Society for General Psychology, American Psychological Association, 2008
- Mensa Foundation – Mensa Award for Excellence in Research, (2005) - for "Dissecting practical intelligence theory: Its claims and evidence".
- Fellow, Association for Psychological Science, elected 1998.
- Fellow, American Psychological Association, elected 1994.
- Fellow, Society for Industrial and Organizational Psychology, elected 1994.
