= Nations and IQ =

Area of study

The relationship between nations and IQ is a controversial area of study concerning differences between nations in average intelligence test scores, their possible causes, and their correlation with measures of social well-being and economic prosperity.

This debate started in the early 2000's after Richard Lynn and Tatu Vanhanen constructed and published IQ estimates for many countries using literature reviews, student assessment studies and other methodologies. Their results and conclusions caused significant controversy, and their approach has been criticized on theoretical and methodological grounds. The European Human Behavior and Evolution Association issued a formal statement in 2020 discouraging use of Lynn's datasets and describing them as unscientific.

Subsequent research by psychologists such as Earl B. Hunt, Jelte Wicherts and Heiner Rindermann has focused on identifying potential national differences in IQ, investigating possible causal factors, and determining the nature of the relationship of IQ to variables such as GDP, life expectancy, and governance.

Other psychologists such as Robert J. Sternberg and Elena Grigorenko have cautioned that IQ comparisons between rich and poor nations can be "dangerously misleading" and that comparisons which extend beyond the industrialized West are essentially meaningless.

== National comparisons of IQ ==
=== "Average IQ values in various European countries" ===
The 1981 article "Average IQ values in various European countries" by Vinko Buj is the only international IQ study that over a short time period has compared IQs using the same IQ test. Rindermann (2007) states that it is of dubious quality with scant information regarding how it was done.

=== Lynn and Vanhanen ===
In 2002, Richard Lynn and Tatu Vanhanen published the books IQ and the Wealth of Nations and IQ and Global Inequality, which led to further investigations by other researchers, most of them highly critical of Lynn and Vanhanen's methods and conclusions. This was followed by their 2006 book IQ and Global Inequality. In these books they created estimates of average IQs for 113 nations. They estimated IQs of 79 other nations based on neighboring nations or by other methods. They also created an estimate of "quality of human conditions" for each nation based on gross national product per capita, adult literacy rate, fraction of the population to enroll in secondary education, life expectancy, and rate of democratization. Lynn and Vanhanen found a substantial correlation between the national IQ scores they created and these various socioeconomic factors. They conclude that national IQ influences these measures of well-being, and that national differences in IQ are heavily influenced by genetics, although they also allow for some environmental contributions to it. They regard nutrition as the most important environmental factor, and education a secondary factor.

Many negative reviews of these books have been published in the scholarly literature. In particular, the claim that the IQ tests employed are culturally neutral and unbiased has been criticized, as have the methods used to compile the data.

Susan Barnett and Wendy Williams characterized IQ and the Wealth of Nations as "an edifice built on layer upon layer of arbitrary assumptions and selective data manipulation. The data on which the entire book is based are of questionable validity and are used in ways that cannot be justified."

Rindermann wrote that Lynn and Vanhanen's mixture of many different tests and the not always clear representativeness of the samples seem to be the most serious problems. Furthermore, the measurement years vary, which is problematic because of the Flynn effect. He also argued that the method of averaging neighboring countries for an estimation for the many nations that did not have measured IQs is likely problematic because some research indicates that absence of IQ tests indicates conditions such as poverty or war that may affect IQs, and that "In addition, some errors in the data have been observed".

On July 27, 2020, the European Human Behavior and Evolution Association issued a formal statement opposing the utilization of Lynn's national IQ datasets, arguing that they "fall a long way short of the expected scientific standard of rigour, in terms of both data curation and measure validity." The organization concluded, "Any conclusions drawn from analyses which use these data are therefore unsound, and no reliable evolutionary work should be using these data."

Writing for Stat in 2024, seven scientists documented that despite widely-known methodological flaws and Lynn's explicitly racist agenda and history of academic malpractice, Lynn's studies of national IQ were still widely cited, with at least 70 citations in the previous five years. The group called for retractions by the journals or their publishers of all of his work on national IQ, as well as investigations of those papers which cited these studies.

=== Wicherts, Dolan and van der Maas' analysis ===
In 2009 Jelte M. Wicherts, Conor V. Dolan, and Han L.J. van der Maas conducted a new analysis of IQ in sub-Saharan Africa, which was critical of many of Lynn and Vanhanen's methods. Wicherts et al. concluded that Lynn and Vanhanen had relied on unsystematic methodology by failing to publish their criteria for including or excluding studies. They found that Lynn and Vanhanen's exclusion of studies had depressed their IQ estimate for sub-Saharan Africa, and that including studies excluded in "IQ and Global Inequality" resulted in average IQ of 82 for sub-Saharan Africa, lower than the average in Western countries, but higher than Lynn and Vanhanen's estimate of 67. Wicherts et al. conclude that this difference is likely due to sub-Saharan Africa having limited access to modern advances in education, nutrition and health care.

=== International student assessment studies ===
Rindermann (2007) states that the correlations between scores of international student assessment studies and psychometric measures of national IQ are very high. His analysis found many of the same groupings and correlations found by Lynn and Vanhanen, with the lowest scores in sub-Saharan Africa, and a correlation of .60 between cognitive skill and GDP per capita. According to Hunt, Rindermann's analysis was more reliable than those by Lynn and Vanhanen.

However, a 2017 systematic review notes that other researchers have dismissed Rindermann's findings on the basis that "the meaning of variables shifts when you aggregate to different levels; a conceptual, methodological point that is well-established in the field of multi-level modelling." In particular, James Flynn writes that "Rindermann's results suggest that different factors lie behind the emergence of g in international comparisons and the emergence of g when we compare the differential performance of individuals. This renders g(l) and g(ID) so unlike that they have little significance in common." Similarly, Martin Brunner and Romain Martin argue that Rindermann's identification of "a common factor underlying measures of intelligence and student achievement on the cross-national level" is methodologically flawed, stating that given "the level of analysis applied . . . this factor cannot be interpreted as general cognitive ability (g). Rather it is an indicator of a nation's prosperity."

== Significance ==
Earl B. Hunt writes that economists traditionally view differences in wealth between nations in terms of human capital, which is a general term for the abilities of the workforce. He argues that substantial correlations between intelligence test scores and measures of well-being exist when the analysis is limited to developed countries, where the IQ results are more likely to be accurate. According to Hunt, such studies are important because they measure the cognitive skills necessary to excel in a post-industrial world.

Hunt and Wittman (2008) state that although the correlation between national IQ and economic well-being is clear, any possible causality between them is more difficult to determine. Writing with Robert J. Sternberg in 2006, Hunt argued:

When dealing with dramatically different levels of health, educational opportunity and economic development within the country, the concept of national IQ is meaningless without carefully designed probability samples of the population. What is the national IQ of the US, for example? There is tremendous range, and averages may vary widely across different parts of the country. Does the average reflect anything in general about the US or its citizens? We think not.

== Potential causes of national differences ==
Since the 20th century, there have been worldwide continual increases in measured IQ. This rise has been correlated with degrees of rising education levels, and as such may provide a partial explanation for observed differences in average IQ scores between nations. Wicherts et al. have suggested that national differences in IQ could be because African countries have not yet experienced the improvements that cause the Flynn effect in the developed world, such as improvements in nutrition and health, and educational attainment. Wicherts, Borsboom, and Dolan (2010) criticized evolutionary studies for problems such as ignoring or assuming that the Flynn effect is equal worldwide and assuming that there have been no migrations and changes in climate over the course of evolution. They argue that "national IQs are strongly confounded with the current developmental status of countries. National IQs correlate with all the variables that have been suggested to have caused the Flynn Effect in the developed world."

Eppig, Fincher, and Thornhill (2010) states that the most important factor in predicting national IQ by a large margin is the prevalence of infectious disease. The authors argue that "From an energetics standpoint, a developing human will have difficulty building a brain and fighting off infectious diseases at the same time, as both are very metabolically costly tasks" and that "the Flynn effect may be caused in part by the decrease in the intensity of infectious diseases as nations develop."

David Marks (2010) argues that differences in average IQ scores between national groups and across time periods can be fully accounted for by differences in literacy levels, and that "IQ distributions will converge if opportunities are equalized for different population groups to achieve the same high level of literacy skills."

== Objections to national comparisons of IQ ==
Several authors, including Leon Kamin in The Science and Politics of IQ, Angela Saini in Superior: The Return of Race Science, and John P. Jackson, Jr. and Nadine M. Weidman in Race, Racism, and Science, have argued that since the early years of IQ testing comparisons between nations have been used to justify discrimination against people based on race, ethnicity, and national origin.

In a 2001 review article, Robert J. Sternberg, Elena Grigorenko, and Donald Bundy argued that IQ comparisons between rich and poor nations can be "dangerously misleading", and that IQ comparisons between nations may be meaningfully applied "only through selected segments of the Western part of the industrialized world." They argue that "scores from tests used in cultures or subcultures other than those for which the tests were specifically created are suspect, and probably of doubtful validity in many if not most cases."

In their review of IQ and the Wealth of Nations, Wendy Williams and Susan Barnett write that cross-country comparisons of IQ are "virtually meaningless" due to "an omnipresent ... confusion of correlation with causation that undermines the foundation of the book."

In their 2020 statement rebutting Lynn's dataset, the European Human Behavior and Evolution Association stated:

Beyond the wholly inadequate construction of the dataset, there is a fundamental problem in trying to use Western IQ tests across diverse cultural settings. Work with the Tsimane and with children in Mali, for instance, has demonstrated that low scores on IQ tests in these groups are not replicated in other, more culturally relevant or familiar tasks. Even those IQ tests which claim to be culture-neutral, such as the Cattel “Culture Fair Intelligence Test”, rely on modes of thinking which are routinely embedded in Western education systems (e.g. analysing 2-dimensional stimuli), but not reflective of skills and learning experiences of a large proportion of the global population.

== See also ==
- Outline of human intelligence
- History of the race and intelligence controversy
- Brain drain
- Race and intelligence
- List of countries by GDP (PPP) per capita
