= Race Differences in Intelligence (book) =

2006 book by Richard Lynn

- Author: Richard Lynn
- Publisher: Washington Summit Publishers
- Publication date: March 2006
- Pages: 338
- ISBN: 1-59368-021-X

Race Differences in Intelligence: An Evolutionary Analysis is a 2006 book by controversial race and intelligence writer Richard Lynn. The book reviews selected literature on IQ testing and argues that genetic racial differences exist, with a discussion of the causes and consequences. Reviews of the book fault the selection of data used, the methodology, and the conclusions drawn from the data, resulting in criticism that it is "the sort of book that gives IQ testing a bad name."

== Summary ==
As with Lynn's and Tatu Vanhanen's 2006 book IQ and Global Inequality, the book was published by Washington Summit Publishers. It was followed in 2008 by The Global Bell Curve. Lynn's survey is an expansion by nearly four times of the data collected in his 2002 book IQ and the Wealth of Nations with Tatu Vanhanen, which dealt with the relationship between IQ and economic development.

The book claims to represent the largest collection and review of the global Intelligence Quotient (IQ) data, surveying 620 published studies from around the world, with a total of 813,778 tested individuals.

Lynn defines races as the genetic clusters or ancestral population groups identified in previous genetic cluster analysis by Luigi Cavalli-Sforza and his colleagues in their 1994 book The History and Geography of Human Genes. Many current ethnic groups would be mixtures of these races.

== Reception ==
Psychology professor J. Philippe Rushton, who argued for many of the same conclusions as Lynn and served with Lynn on the board of the Pioneer Fund, wrote a favorable review and called it Lynn's "crowning achievement".

In a 2008 review of the data used in Lynn's book, Hunt and Wittmann write:

"The majority of the data points were based upon convenience rather than representative samples. Some points were not even based on residents of the country. For instance, the "data point" for Suriname was based on tests given to Surinamese who had migrated to the Netherlands, and the "data point" for Ethiopia was based on the IQ scores of a highly selected group that had emigrated to Israel and, for cultural and historical reasons, was hardly representative of the Ethiopian population. The data point for Mexico was based upon a weighted averaging of the results of a study of "Native American and Mestizo children in southern Mexico" with result of a study of residents of Argentina. Upon reading the original reference, we found that the "data point" that Lynn and Vanhanen used for the lowest IQ estimate, Equatorial Guinea, was actually the mean IQ of a group of Spanish children in a home for the developmentally disabled in Spain. Corrections were applied to adjust for differences in IQ across cohorts (the "Flynn" effect), on the assumption that the same correction could be applied internationally, without regard to the cultural or economic development level of the country involved. While there appears to be rather little evidence on cohort effect upon IQ across the developing countries, one study in Kenya (Daley, Whaley, Sigman, Espinosa, & Neumann, 2003) shows a substantially larger cohort effect than is reported for developed countries."

A review by Nicholas Mackintosh, Emeritus Professor in the Department of Experimental Psychology, University of Cambridge, expresses astonishment that Lynn infers that Kalahari bushmen, with an average measured IQ of 54, should be regarded as intellectually disabled; and that an 8-year-old European child with the equivalent mental age would have no problems surviving in the same desert environment. Mackintosh questions Lynn's hypothesis that migration to more harsh northern climates and ice ages selected for higher IQ by pointing to harshness of environments such as the Australian Outback. Lynn argues that racial differences in brain size indicates different evolutionary pressure on intelligence. Mackintosh argues that the cranial capacity of early Homo sapiens, 100,000 or more years ago, was rather greater than that of modern Europeans. He criticizes Lynn for reporting data incorrectly, in some cases from studies by Mackintosh himself. He writes: "The errors may not be particularly important, and I do not know how typical they are. But they do not increase my confidence in Lynn's scholarship." He also writes:

A more egregious example is provided by his treatment of the Eyferth (1961) study of two groups of illegitimate children fathered by (mostly) American black and white servicemen and brought up by their (carefully matched) German mothers. Eyferth reported an average IQ of 96.5 for the mixed race children and of 97.2 for the whites. Lynn reduces the former number to 94 to compensate for use of an old test, and compares it, not with the score of the white sample, but with an average IQ of 100 for German children. He is thus able to conclude that the IQ of these mixed race children is half way between that of Americans and Africans. He derives the same conclusion from the Weinberg, Scarr, and Waldman (1992) transracial adoption study since, at the 10-year follow-up, the mixed race children had an average IQ of 94, mid-way between the 102 of the white children and the 89 of the black children. He omits to mention one of the more salient features of this follow-up, namely, that there had been substantial attrition in the white sample—with a loss of those children with lower IQ scores, resulting in an overestimate of the white group's IQ by some 6 points.

"Much labour has gone into this book. But I fear it is the sort of book that gives IQ testing a bad name. As a source of references, it will be useful to some. As a source of information, it should be treated with some suspicion. On the other hand, Lynn's preconceptions are so plain, and so pungently expressed, that many readers will be suspicious from the outset."

A review by John C. Loehlin, University of Texas Professor emeritus, argues that the general trends in the data that Lynn presents are probably dependable, but faults Lynn for carelessness in how his conclusions are presented. Loehlin summarizes his view of the book as follows:

Is this book the final word on race differences in intelligence? Of course not. But Richard Lynn is a major player, and it is good to have his extensive work on this topic together in one place. Future workers who address these matters under this or any other label will find that Lynn has done a lot of spadework for them. And they will also find that there is plenty to ponder over within these pages.

== See also ==
- Race and intelligence
- Evolution of human intelligence
- Intelligence and public policy
