= Heiner Rindermann =

German psychologist (born 1966)

Heiner Rindermann (born 12 March 1966) is a German psychologist and educational researcher.

== Academic career ==
Rindermann received a Ph.D. in psychology in 1995 on the subject of teacher evaluations from Heidelberg University and completed a Habilitation in 2005 on the topic of teacher quality at University of Koblenz and Landau. In September 2007 he was appointed professor for evaluation and methodology of developmental psychology at the University of Graz. Since April 2010, Rindermann holds the Chair of Educational and Developmental Psychology at the Technical University of Chemnitz.

Rindermann attended the 2018 London Conference on Intelligence, and was one of 15 attendees to collaborate on a letter defending the conference following media reports of its ties to white supremacy, neo-Nazism, and racist pseudoscience. The letter was published in the journal Intelligence in 2018, where he served on the editorial board. He has also written for the pseudoscientific journals OpenPsych and Mankind Quarterly.

== Research ==
Rindermann does research in educational psychology, developmental psychology, differential psychology, pedagogy, and clinical psychology.

=== Intelligence and education ===
A 2007 study by Rindermann found a high correlation between the results of international student assessment studies including TIMSS, PIRLS, and PISA, and national average IQ scores. The results were broadly similar to those in Richard Lynn and Tatu Vanhanen's book IQ and the Wealth of Nations. According to Earl B. Hunt, due to there being far more data available, Rindermann's analysis was more reliable than those by Richard Lynn and Tatu Vanhanen. By measuring the relationship between educational data and social well-being over time, Rindermann also performed a causal analysis, finding that nations investing in education leads to increased well-being later on. Rindermann has defended the controversial anti-immigration book Germany Abolishes Itself (2010) by Thilo Sarrazin, which cites his research.

In October 2015, Rindermann published an article in the magazine Focus in which he claimed that immigrants and asylum seekers from Southeast Europe, the Middle East, and Africa predominantly had lower educational profiles and IQs than Germans and predicted serious future integration problems for these groups in Germany. The Faculty of Humanities and Social Sciences and the Institute of Psychology at Chemnitz University subsequently publicly distanced themselves from his statement and his colleagues criticized the article for mixing opinion and facts and for drawing discriminatory conclusions.

A 2024 paper by Rindermann titled "Surprisingly low results from studies on cognitive ability in developing countries" was retracted by the journal Discover Education when it was brought to the journal's attention that the dataset and methodology used in the research were scientifically unsound. The journal stated, "Independent post-publication peer review has confirmed fundamental flaws in the use of student assessment studies as a measure of IQ or cognitive ability, and in the prominence of individual examples taken from the author's life."

Some of Rindermann's work has concentrated on the "smart fraction" theory, which states that the prosperity and performance of a society depends on the proportion of the population that is above a particular threshold of intelligence, with the threshold point being well above the general median intelligence level in most societies.

Rindermann's book Cognitive capitalism: Human capital and the wellbeing of nations was released by Cambridge University Press in 2018.
