= IQ and Global Inequality =

2006 book by Richard Lynn and Tatu Vanhanen

- Cover
- Author: Richard Lynn; Tatu Vanhanen
- Language: English
- Genre: Human intelligence, political science, sociology, economics
- Publisher: Washington Summit Publishers
- Publication date: 10 November 2006
- Media type: Print (hardcover)
- Pages: 442
- ISBN: 1-59368-025-2
- OCLC: 261200394

IQ and Global Inequality is a 2006 book by psychologist Richard Lynn and political scientist Tatu Vanhanen. IQ and Global Inequality is follow-up to their 2002 book IQ and the Wealth of Nations, an expansion of the argument that international differences in current economic development are due in part to differences in average national intelligence as indicated by national IQ estimates, and a response to critics. The book was published by Washington Summit Publishers, a white nationalist and eugenicist publishing group.

Lynn and Vanhanen's research on national IQs has attracted widespread criticism of the book's scores, methodology, and conclusions. On July 27, 2020, the European Human Behavior and Evolution Association issued a formal statement opposing the utilization of Lynn's national IQ dataset, citing various methodological concerns. They concluded, "Any conclusions drawn from analyses which use these data are therefore unsound, and no reliable evolutionary work should be using these data."

== Summary ==
In IQ and Global Inequality Lynn and Vanhanen argue that intelligence, as measured by IQ tests, is a major contributor to national wealth as well as to various measures of social well-being. They base this argument on the finding that nations' average IQs have a strong correlation with several such factors, among them adult literacy (0.64), tertiary education (0.75), life expectancy (0.77), and democratization (0.57). The book is a follow-up to Lynn and Vanhanen's 2002 book IQ and the Wealth of Nations, and expands on many of the ideas presented in their earlier book.

IQ and Global Inequality responds to some of the criticisms directed against the earlier book. To address the criticism that measures of national IQ are unreliable, for 71 nations they measure national IQs using two different methods, and find that the correlation between different measures of national IQ is 0.95. As a further argument for reliability, they find that their reported national IQs are correlated with various measures of math and science achievement, with correlations ranging from 0.79 to 0.89.

Finally, the book presents the authors' theory as to the cause of national IQs. They propose a model of gene-environment interaction in which high IQ leads to better nutrition, education and health care, further enhancing IQ. They also propose that the racial composition of countries is an important factor in national IQs. They base this conclusion on the observation that national IQs can generally be predicted from the countries' racial composition, and that national IQs of racially similar countries tend to cluster together.

=== National IQ and QHC values ===
Lynn and Vanhanen base their analysis on selected IQ data from studies which covered 113 nations. For another 79 nations, they estimated the mean IQs on the basis of the arithmetic means of the measured IQs of neighboring countries. They justify this method of estimation by claiming that the correlation between the estimated national IQs they reported in IQ and the Wealth of Nations and the measured national IQs since obtained is very high (0.91).

Lynn and Vanhanen calculated the national IQs in relation to a British mean of 100, with a standard deviation of 15. They adjusted all test results to account for the Flynn effect: adjustments were 2 points per decade for Raven's Progressive Matrices and 3 points per decade for all other types of tests. When two IQ studies were used from one country, their mean was calculated, whereas when three or more were available, the median was used.

== Reception ==
Academic reviews of the book generally criticized both its methodology and conclusions.

The methodology of the study was criticized by Richard E. Nisbett for relying on small and haphazard samples and for ignoring data that did not support the conclusions.

University of Reading geographer Stephen Morse also criticized the book (as well as IQ and the Wealth of Nations), arguing that the authors' hypothesis rests on "serious flaws". Morse also argued: "The central dilemma of the Lynn and Vanhanen case rests with their assumption that national IQ data are primarily (not wholly) a function of innate ability, which in turn is at least partly generated by genes. There are many assumptions of cause–effect in here, and some of them involve substantial leaps of faith."

Wicherts and colleagues stated: "In light of all the available IQ data of over 37,000 African testtakers, only the use of unsystematic methods to exclude the vast majority of data could result in a mean IQ close to 70. On the basis of sound methods, the average IQ remains close to 80. Although this mean IQ is clearly lower than 100, we view it as unsurprising in light of the potential of the Flynn effect in Africa (Wicherts, Borsboom, & Dolan, 2010) and common psychometric problems associated with the use of western IQ tests among Africans."

Some later studies using average national IQ data have checked their results against both data sets. One of these studies has since been retracted by the publisher for relying on Lynn's flawed data.

Earl Hunt cited this work as an example of scientists going far beyond the empirical support to make controversial policy recommendations, and as such as examples of irresponsible uses of science. Hunt argues that in their argumentation they both made the basic mistake of assigning causality to a correlation without evidence, and that they made "staggeringly low" estimates of Sub-Saharan African IQs based on highly problematic data. He considers that by their negligence of observing good scientific practice Lynn and Vanhanen are not living up to the basic responsibility of scientists to make sure that their results can function as reasonable empirical support for policy decisions.

On July 27, 2020, the European Human Behavior and Evolution Association issued a formal statement opposing the utilization of Lynn's national IQ dataset, citing various methodological concerns. They concluded, "Any conclusions drawn from analyses which use these data are therefore unsound, and no reliable evolutionary work should be using these data."

== See also ==
- Race and intelligence
- Evolution of human intelligence
- Cattell Culture Fair Intelligence Test
- Eugenics
- Intelligence and public policy
- Scientific racism

=== Publications ===
- The Mismeasure of Man - Stephen Jay Gould (1981)
- The Bell Curve - Richard J. Herrnstein and Charles Murray (1994)
- Race Differences in Intelligence - Richard Lynn (2006)
