= What Is Intelligence? =

2007 book by James R. Flynn

What is Intelligence?: Beyond the Flynn Effect
- Author: James R. Flynn
- Published: September 2007 Cambridge University Press
- Media type: Hardcover
- Pages: 216
- ISBN: 978-0-521-88007-7
- OCLC: 122291517
- Dewey Decimal: 153.9 22
- LC Class: BF431 .F57 2007

What Is Intelligence?: Beyond the Flynn Effect is a book by psychologist James R. Flynn which outlines his model for an explanation of the eponymous Flynn effect. The book summarizes much of the work of Flynn in this area, as well as that of his colleague William Dickens of the Brookings Institution.

== The four "paradoxes" of the Flynn effect ==
The book begins with a description of what has generally become known as "the Flynn effect": the steady rise from one generation to the next in average scores on IQ tests over time. Flynn notes that this effect apparently contradicts some fundamental beliefs about IQ long held by human intelligence researchers, and categorizes these contradictions into four seeming "paradoxes":

1. The factor analysis paradox – past research has shown evidence for a single factor, "g" or general intelligence, underlying IQ. However, the Flynn effect happens to different degrees in the sub-tests of the WISC test, suggesting that intelligence as measured by IQ tests is multidimensional. Flynn poses this as: "how can intelligence be both one and many at the same time".
2. The intelligence paradox – the Flynn effect shows significant improvements in IQ over a short time scale, yet we do not notice in everyday life that young people are significantly smarter than their parents or grandparents.
3. The mental retardation paradox – the IQ level commonly associated with mental retardation is 75. If the Flynn effect is extrapolated back to 1900 the mean IQ would be somewhere between 50 and 70 – that is the average person in 1900 would have been intellectually disabled by modern IQ norms.
4. The identical twins paradox – past IQ research has shown a close relation between the IQs of identical twins reared separately; a fact used as evidence for a genetic basis for differences in IQ. The rapid changes in IQ shown by the Flynn effect suggest, conversely, that environmental factors have a greater influence on IQ than genes.

Much of the remainder of the book is then devoted to proposing possible ways to resolve these inconsistencies, outlining along the way a reconceptualization of "intelligence" and how it might be better measured and studied.

== The Dickens/Flynn model ==
The Dickens/Flynn model, as outlined in the book, attempts to explain the Flynn effect by suggesting that genes and environment have interacted in manner which leads to a multiplying of influence from both on IQ scores. In particular, people now live in a cognitive environment that has changed substantially over the past century. New ways of thinking and new modes of communication and entertainment have changed the way people think across society. At an individual level a similar multiplying effect leads to people with a genetic advantage in intelligence seeking out more cognitively challenging environments – thus exaggerating individual differences in intelligence. In both cases the role of an enhanced cognitive environment plays a role in within-generation and across-generation differences in IQ scores.

== Conceptual framework (BIDS) ==
Flynn offers a framework for further developing theories of intelligence. The framework involves three conceptual levels for understanding intelligence:

- B – brain. How the brain is structured
- ID – individual differences. How individuals differ in cognitive tasks.
- S – society. How real-world cognitive tasks show trends over time.

Flynn goes on to criticize conceptual imperialism as being a particular error in which those various levels are confused with one single level – for example brain or social differences being seen primarily in terms of general-intelligence, a concept from the individual-differences level.

== Shorthand abstractions (SHA) ==
Flynn offers as a mechanism for improved cognitive performance across society, shorthand abstractions (a.k.a. SHAs) A SHA is a word or phrase that describes some complex phenomenon in a way that enables people to more easily think about abstract issues. As examples, Flynn suggested market (in an economic sense), percentage, natural selection and placebo.

== Reviews ==
Charles Murray, the co-author of The Bell Curve (1994), wrote in his comments about this book that appeared on its back cover in publication, "This book is a gold mine of pointers to interesting work, much of which was new to me. All of us who wrestle with the extraordinarily difficult questions about intelligence that Flynn discusses are in his debt."

- Netherlands Journal of Psychology
- New Yorker
- American Scholar
- New Scientist
- Cosma Shalizi
- Tyler Cowen
