= HGA =

HGA can stand for:

- Handweavers Guild of America
- Holy Guardian Angel, a religious term
- High-gain antenna, for radio
- Human granulocytic anaplasmosis, a disease
- Hargeisa Airport
- Human Genetics Alert, originally Campaign Against Human Genetic Engineering
