= IQ and the Wealth of Nations =

2002 book by Richard Lynn

- Cover
- Author: Richard Lynn; Tatu Vanhanen
- Language: English
- Subject: Human intelligence, economic inequality, psychology, sociology
- Publisher: Praeger/Greenwood
- Publication date: 28 February 2002 (24 years, 252 days)
- Media type: Print (hardcover)
- Pages: 320
- ISBN: 978-0275975104

IQ and the Wealth of Nations is a 2002 book by psychologist Richard Lynn and political scientist Tatu Vanhanen. The authors argue that differences in national income (in the form of per capita gross domestic product) are correlated with differences in the average national intelligence quotient (IQ). They further argue that differences in average national IQs constitute one important factor, but not the only one, contributing to differences in national wealth and rates of economic growth.

The book has drawn widespread criticism from other academics. Critiques have included questioning of the methodology used, the incompleteness of the data, and the conclusions drawn from the analysis. On July 27, 2020, in the aftermath of the murder of George Floyd, the European Human Behavior and Evolution Association issued a formal statement opposing the utilization of Lynn's national IQ dataset, citing various methodological concerns. They concluded, "Any conclusions drawn from analyses which use these data are therefore unsound, and no reliable evolutionary work should be using these data."

The 2006 book IQ and Global Inequality is a follow-up to IQ and the Wealth of Nations by the same authors.

== Outline ==
The book includes the authors' calculation of average IQ scores for 60 countries, based on their analysis of published reports. It reports their observation that national IQ correlates with gross domestic product per capita at 0.82, and with the rate of economic growth from 1950 to 1990 at 0.64.

The authors believe that average IQ differences between nations are due to both genetic and environmental factors. They also believe that low GDP can cause low IQ, just as low IQ can cause low GDP. (See Positive feedback).

The authors write that it is the ethical responsibility of rich, high-IQ nations to assist poor, low-IQ nations financially, as it is the responsibility of rich citizens to assist the poor.

== National IQ estimates ==
The result claims that Hong Kong has the highest national IQ estimate with 107, followed by South Korea with 106. The result also claims that Mali was the lowest national IQ estimate with 54, followed by Nepal at 56.

Central to the book's thesis is a tabulation of what Lynn and Vanhanen believe to be the average IQs of the world's nations. Rather than do their own IQ studies, the authors average and adjust existing studies and use other methods to create estimates.

For 104 of the 185 nations, no studies were available. In those cases, the authors have used an estimated value by taking averages of the IQs of neighboring or comparable nations. For example, the authors arrived at a figure of 84 for El Salvador by averaging their calculations of 79 for Guatemala and 88 for Colombia. Including those estimated IQs, the correlation of IQ and GDP is 0.62.

To obtain a figure for South Africa, the authors averaged IQ studies done on different ethnic groups, resulting in a figure of 72. The figures for Colombia, Peru, and Singapore were arrived at in a similar manner.

In some cases, the IQ of a country is estimated by averaging the IQs of countries that are not actually neighbors of the country in question. For example, Kyrgyzstan's IQ is estimated by averaging the IQs of Iran and Turkey, neither of which is close to Kyrgyzstan—China, which is a geographic neighbor, is not counted as such by Lynn and Vanhanen. This is because ethnic background is assumed to be more important than proximity to other nations when determining national IQ.

To account for the Flynn effect (an increase in IQ scores over time), the authors adjusted the results of older studies upward by a number of points.

=== Scores that do not support the theory ===
In several cases the actual GDP did not correspond with that predicted by IQ. In these cases, the authors argued that differences in GDP were caused by differences in natural resources and whether the nation used a planned or market economy.

One example of this was Qatar, whose IQ was estimated by Lynn and Vanhanen to be about 78, yet had a disproportionately high per capita GDP of roughly US$17,000. The authors explain Qatar's disproportionately high GDP by its high petroleum resources. Similarly, the authors think that large resources of diamonds explain the economic growth of the African nation Botswana, the fastest in the world for several decades.

The authors argued that the People's Republic of China's per capita GDP of at the time roughly US$4,500 could be explained by its use of a communist economic system for much of its recent history. The authors also predicted that communist nations whom they believe have comparatively higher IQs, including China and North Korea, can be expected to rapidly gain GDP growth by moving from centrally planned economies to more capitalist based economic systems, while predicting continued poverty for sub-Saharan African nations no matter what economic systems are used.

== Reception and impact ==
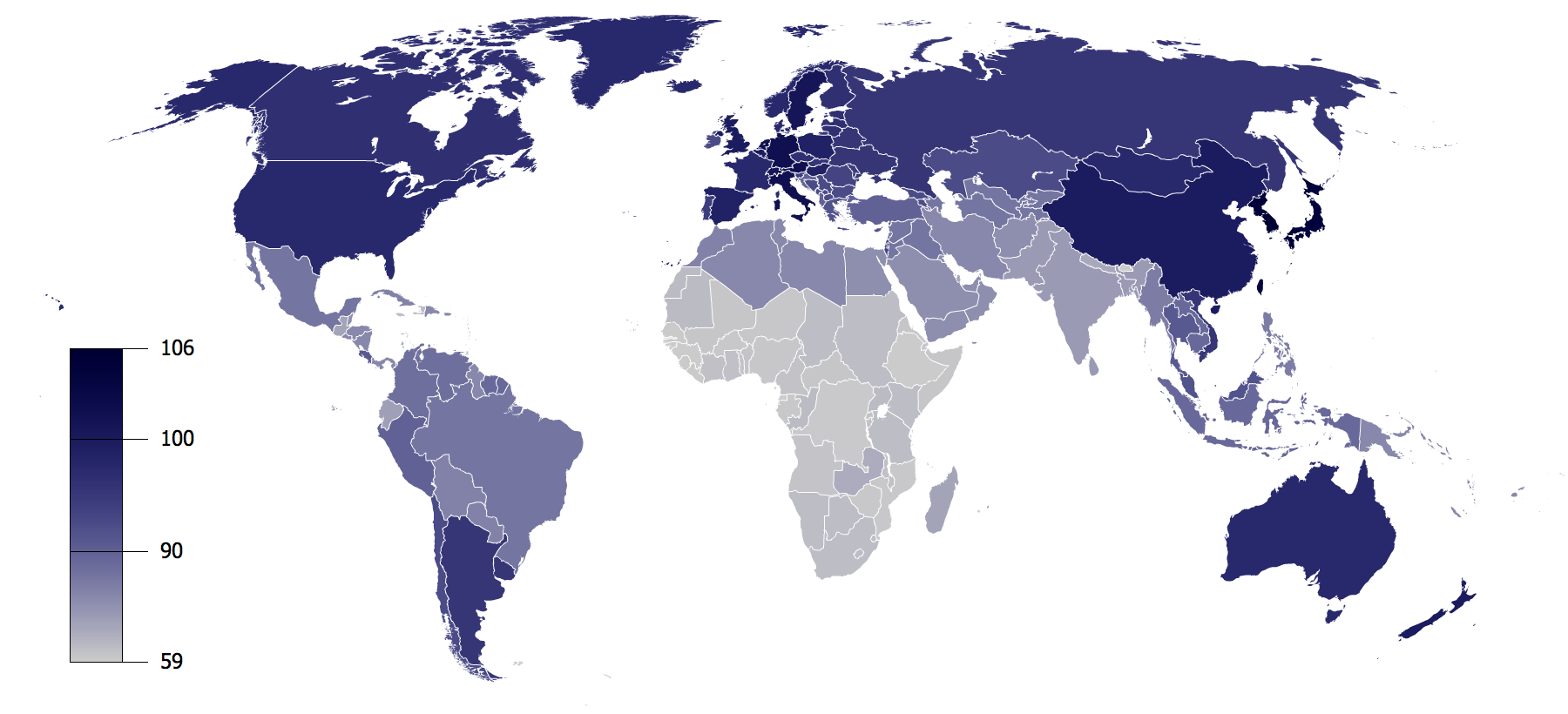
Map depicting average IQ values as presented in the follow-up scientific study, 'Intelligence and the Wealth and Poverty of Nations'

Several negative reviews of the book have been published in the scholarly literature. Susan Barnett and Wendy Williams wrote that "we see an edifice built on layer upon layer of arbitrary assumptions and selective data manipulation. The data on which the entire book is based are of questionable validity and are used in ways that cannot be justified." They also wrote that cross country comparisons are "virtually meaningless."

Richardson (2004) argued, citing the Flynn effect as the best evidence, that Lynn has the causal connection backwards and suggested that "the average IQ of a population is simply an index of the size of its middle class, both of which are results of industrial development". The review concludes that "This is not so much science, then, as a social crusade." A review by Michael Palairet criticized the book's methodology, particularly the imprecise estimates of GDP and the fact that IQ data were only available for 81 of the 185 countries studied. However, the review concluded that the book was "a powerful challenge to economic historians and development economists who prefer not to use IQ as an analytical input", but that it's likely those scholars will deliberately ignore this work instead of improving it.

=== By economists ===
In a book review for the Journal of Economic Literature, Thomas Nechyba wrote that "such sweeping conclusions based on relatively weak statistical evidence and dubious presumptions seem misguided at best and quite dangerous if taken seriously. It is therefore difficult to find much to recommend in this book."

Writing in the Economic Journal, Astrid Oline Ervik said that the book may be "thought provoking", but there is nothing that economists can learn from it. She criticized the book's authors for not establishing cross country comparability and reliability of IQ scores, for relying on simple bivariate correlations, for not considering or controlling for other hypotheses, and for confusing correlation with causation. Ervik stated, "The arguments put forward in the book to justify such comparisons [between the average IQ in different countries and their GDP] seem at best vague and unconvincing. At worst, passages in the book appear to be biased and unscientific...The authors fail to present convincing evidence and appear to jump to conclusions."

Edward Miller, an economist who has published many controversial papers on race and intelligence, gave the book positive reviews in two different white nationalist publications, the Journal of Social, Political, and Economic Studies and The Occidental Quarterly.

=== Criticism of data sets ===
Academic reviews of the book generally criticized both its methodology and conclusions.

The methods of the study were criticized by Richard E. Nisbett for relying on small and haphazard samples and for ignoring data that did not support the conclusions.

University of Reading geographer Stephen Morse also criticized the book (as well as IQ and the Wealth of Nations), arguing that the authors' hypothesis rests on "serious flaws". Morse also argued: "The central dilemma of the Lynn and Vanhanen case rests with their assumption that national IQ data are primarily (not wholly) a function of innate ability, which in turn is at least partly generated by genes. There are many assumptions of cause–effect in here, and some of them involve substantial leaps of faith."

In the 2010 paper "A systematic literature review of the average IQ of sub-Saharan Africans", also published in Intelligence, Jelte M. Wicherts and colleagues stated:

"For instance, Lynn and Vanhanen (2006) accorded a national IQ of 69 to Nigeria on the basis of three samples (Fahrmeier, 1975; Ferron, 1965; Wober, 1969), but they did not consider other relevant published studies that indicated that average IQ in Nigeria is considerably higher than 70 (Maqsud, 1980a, b; Nenty & Dinero, 1981; Okunrotifa, 1976). As Lynn rightly remarked during the 2006 conference of the International Society for Intelligence Research (ISIR), performing a literature review involves making a lot of choices. Nonetheless, an important drawback of Lynn (and Vanhanen)'s reviews of the literature is that they are unsystematic."

Lynn and Gerhard Meisenberg replied that "critical evaluation of the studies presented by WDM shows that many of these are based on unrepresentative elite samples" and that a further literature review, including taking into account results in mathematics, science, and reading, gave "an IQ of 68 as the best reading of the IQ in sub-Saharan Africa". Wicherts and colleagues in yet another reply stated: "In light of all the available IQ data of over 37,000 African testtakers, only the use of unsystematic methods to exclude the vast majority of data could result in a mean IQ close to 70. On the basis of sound methods, the average IQ remains close to 80. Although this mean IQ is clearly lower than 100, we view it as unsurprising in light of the potential of the Flynn effect in Africa (Wicherts, Borsboom, & Dolan, 2010) and common psychometric problems associated with the use of western IQ tests among Africans."

Some criticisms have focused on the limited number of studies upon which the book is based. The IQ figures are based on 3 different studies for 17 nations, two studies for 30 nations, and one study for 34 nations. There were actual tests for IQ in the case of 81 countries out of the 185 countries studied. For 104 nations there were no IQ studies at all and IQ was estimated based on the average IQ of surrounding nations. The limited number of participants in some studies as well as outdated data has also been criticized. A test of 108 9- to 15-year-olds in Barbados, of 50 13- to 16-year-olds in Colombia, of 104 5- to 17-year-olds in Ecuador, of 129 6- to 12-year-olds in Egypt, and of 48 10- to 14-year-olds in Equatorial Guinea, all were taken as measures of national IQ.

Denny Borsboom argued that mainstream contemporary test analysis does not reflect substantial recent developments in the field and "bears an uncanny resemblance to the psychometric state of the art as it existed in the 1950s". For example, he argued that IQ and the Wealth of Nations, in order to show that the tests are unbiased, uses outdated methodology – if anything, indicative that test bias exists. Girma Berhanu, in an essay review of the book, concentrated on the discussion of Ethiopian Jews. The review criticized the principal assertion of the authors that differences in intelligence, attributed to genetics, account for the gap between rich and poor countries. Berhanu criticized the book as being based in a "racist, sexist, and antihuman" research tradition and alleged that "the low standards of scholarship evident in the book render it largely irrelevant for modern science".

=== Impact on psychology ===
In 2006, Lynn and Vanhanen followed IQ and the Wealth of Nations with their book IQ and Global Inequality, which contained additional data and analyses, but the same general conclusions as the earlier book. Discussing both books, Earl Hunt writes that although Lynn and Vanhanen's methodology and conclusions are questionable, they deserve credit for raising important questions about international IQ comparisons. Hunt writes that Lynn and Vanhanen are correct that national IQs correlate strongly with measures of social well-being, but they are unjustified in their rejection of the idea that national IQs could change as a result of improved education.

On July 27, 2020, the European Human Behavior and Evolution Association issued a formal statement opposing the utilization of Lynn's national IQ dataset, as well as all updated forms of it, citing various criticisms of its methodology and data collection. They concluded that "any conclusions drawn from analyses which use these data are therefore unsound, and no reliable evolutionary work should be using these data."

== See also ==
- History of the race and intelligence controversy
- Economic inequality
- IQ and Global Inequality
- The Bell Curve
- The Wealth and Poverty of Nations
