= Ellen Hamaker =

Dutch-American psychologist, and statistician

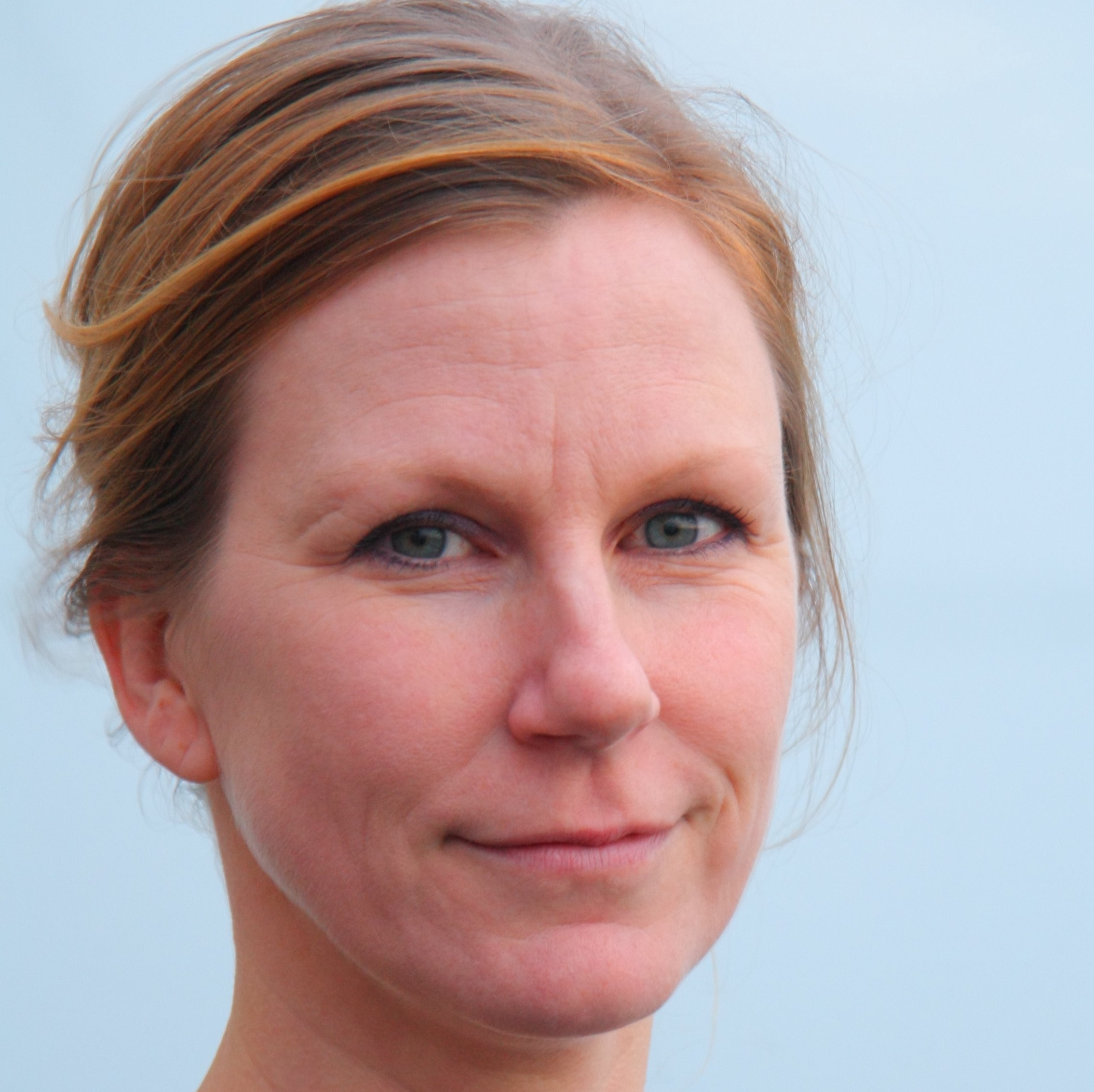
- Born: February 13, 1974 (age 52)
- Education: Utrecht University, University of Amsterdam
- Known for: Random-Intercept Cross-Lagged Panel Model
- Scientific career
- Fields: Psychology, Statistics, Time Series Analysis, Dynamic Modeling
- Workplaces: Utrecht University, KU Leuven, University of Virginia, University of Amsterdam
- Thesis: Time Series Analysis and the Individual as the Unit of Psychological Research (2004)
- Doctoral advisor: Peter Molenaar, Dymph van den Boom, Conor Dolan

Ellen Louise "E.L." Hamaker (born February 13, 1974) is a Dutch-American psychologist, and statistician. Since 2018 she has been a full professor at Utrecht University, holding the chair Longitudinal Data Analysis at the Department of Methodology and Statistics. Her work focuses on the development of statistical models for the analysis of intensive longitudinal data in psychology, mainly within the frameworks of structural equation modeling and time series analysis.

== Biography ==
=== Education ===
Hamaker received a bachelor's and master's degree in psychology from Utrecht University, in 1997 and 1999 respectively. She earned her PhD in psychological methods in 2004 at the University of Amsterdam, under the supervision of Peter Molenaar and Conor Dolan, for her thesis: "Time series analysis and the individual as the unit of psychological research"

=== Academic career ===
In 2005 Hamaker became a postdoctoral fellow at the Department of Psychology, University of Virginia. Hamaker returned to the Netherlands in 2006, being appointed assistant professor at the Department of Methodology and Statistics, Utrecht University. She was promoted to associate professor in 2011, before being promoted to full professor with the chair Longitudinal Data Analysis in 2018. Since 2014 she has also been a research fellow at the Research Group of Quantitative Psychology and Individual Differences, KU Leuven, in Belgium.

=== Research focus ===
Hamaker's early research focused on the application of time series techniques within psychology, to study process that unfold within individuals over time. Increased availability of data collected using the experience sampling method in psychology led to increased interest in this methodology in applied psychological research. Most notable of her papers is her critique of the cross-lagged panel model, in which she proposes to better account for stable trait-like differences between individuals through the use of multilevel models with random intercepts. She is also an advocate of within-person thinking in social sciences, pointing out that conclusions based on cross-sectional data do not necessarily generalize to the processes within a particular person.

Since 2015 Hamaker has collaborated frequently with Bengt O. Muthén and Tihomir Asparouhov in the development of the Dynamic Structural Equation Modeling, a module that allows for Bayesian time series analysis in the software package Mplus.

Hamaker has stated that the overarching goal of her research is to establish a connection between innovative statistical techniques and applied psychological research.

=== Achievements and awards ===
Throughout her academic career, Hamaker has served as associate editor of Multivariate Behavioral Research. In 2019 she was appointed a fellow of the Association for Psychological Science.

== Personal life ==
Hamaker is the granddaughter of Dutch scientist Hugo Christiaan Hamaker, noted for his contributions to physics (the Hamaker constant) and statistics.
