= Richard Lynn =

British psychologist and scientific racist (1930–2023)

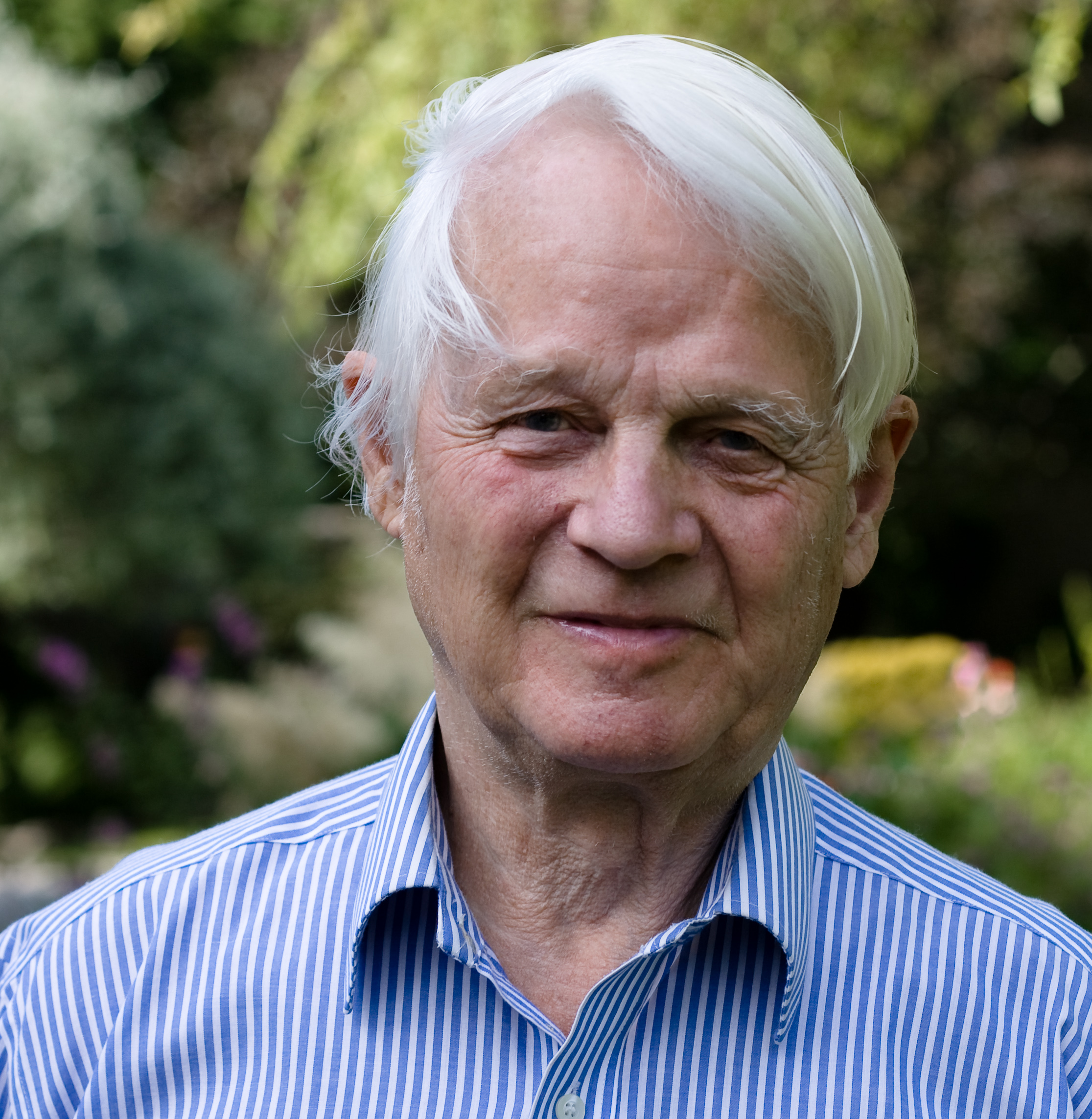
- Lynn in 2008
- Born: 20 February 1930; Hampstead, England
- Died: July 2023 (aged 93)
- Education: King's College, Cambridge (BA, PhD)
- Known for: Research concerning race and intelligence
- Spouses: Susan Maher (m. 1956; div. 1978); Susan Hampson (m. 1990; died 1998); Joyce Walters (m. 2004)
- Children: 3
- Father: Sydney Harland
- Scientific career
- Fields: Psychology
- Workplaces: University of Exeter; Economic and Social Research Institute; Ulster University

Richard Lynn (20 February 1930 – 23 July 2023) was a controversial English psychologist and self-described "scientific racist" who advocated for a genetic relationship between race and intelligence. He was the editor-in-chief of Mankind Quarterly, a white supremacist journal. He was lecturer in psychology at the University of Exeter and professor of psychology at the Economic and Social Research Institute, Dublin, and at the University of Ulster at Coleraine. Lynn was a professor emeritus of psychology at Ulster University, but had the title withdrawn by the university in 2018.

Many scientists criticised Lynn's work for lacking scientific rigour, misrepresenting data, and for promoting a racialist political agenda. Lynn was associated with a network of academics and organisations that promote scientific racism. He had also advocated fringe positions regarding sexual differences in intelligence. In two books co-written with Tatu Vanhanen, Lynn and Vanhanen argued that differences in developmental indexes among various nations are partially caused by the average IQ of their citizens. Earl Hunt and Werner Wittmann (2008) questioned the validity of their research methods and the highly inconsistent quality of the available data points that Lynn and Vanhanen used in their analysis. Lynn also argued that a high fertility rate among individuals of low IQ constitutes a major threat to Western civilisation, as he believed people with low IQ scores will eventually outnumber high-IQ individuals. He argued in favour of anti-immigration and eugenics policies, provoking heavy criticism internationally. Lynn's work was among the main sources cited in the book The Bell Curve, and he was one of 52 scientists who signed an opinion piece in the Wall Street Journal entitled "Mainstream Science on Intelligence", which endorsed a number of the views presented in the book.

He was also on the board of the Pioneer Fund, which funds Mankind Quarterly and has also been described as racist. He was on the editorial board of the journal Personality and Individual Differences until 2019.

== Early life and education ==
Richard Lynn's father was Sydney Cross Harland FRS (1891–1982), an agricultural botanist and geneticist, who had lived and worked in Trinidad and later Peru extensively, establishing himself as an expert in cotton genetics. Lynn's mother Ann Freeman (1905–1964) was originally brought up in Trinidad and then educated at Bournemouth Girls' High School and Harrogate Ladies' College, and had moved back to the Caribbean to act as housekeeper for Harland. Harland was a close colleague of Ann Freeman's father – the director of agriculture in the West Indies — but was still married to his first wife Emily. After a liaison in New York City between Harland and Freeman in 1929, his mother crossed the Atlantic to resettle near to her parents in Hampstead, where Lynn was born on 20 February 1930. In London and then Bristol, his mother raised him as a single parent during his childhood and adolescence. In 1949, after his father returned to Britain as professor of genetics at the University of Manchester, he met up with him roughly every year; Harland's younger brother Bernard became a companion of Lynn's mother, living together until their deaths in 1964.

Lynn was educated at Bristol Grammar School and King's College, Cambridge, where he received a Ph.D. in 1956.

== Career ==
Lynn worked as lecturer in psychology at the University of Exeter and as professor of psychology at the Economic and Social Research Institute, Dublin, and at Ulster University.

In 1974, Lynn published a positive review of Raymond Cattell's A New Morality from Science: Beyondism, in which he expressed the opinion that "incompetent societies have to be allowed to go to the wall" and that "the foreign aid which we give to the under-developed world is a mistake, akin to keeping going incompetent species like the dinosaurs which are not fit for the competitive struggle for existence". In a 2011 interview, Lynn cited the work of Cattell, Francis Galton, Hans Eysenck and Cyril Burt as important influences.

== Work ==
=== Publication on secular increases in IQ ===
In 1982, Richard Lynn published a paper about the generational increase in performance on IQ tests, now known as the Flynn effect slightly before James Flynn's publications documenting the same phenomenon. A few researchers have called the phenomenon the "Lynn–Flynn effect" as a way of recognizing both their contributions. In a 2013 paper, James Flynn offered his comments on this aspect of the effect's naming:

Calling massive IQ gains over time the "Flynn Effect" was an accident of history, a label Charles Murray coined in The Bell Curve in 1994. It is not a verdict a court would have been likely to hand down if it had an eye for the historical record. [...] Therefore, I give my thanks to Charles Murray and my apologies to Richard Lynn.

=== Dysgenics and eugenics ===
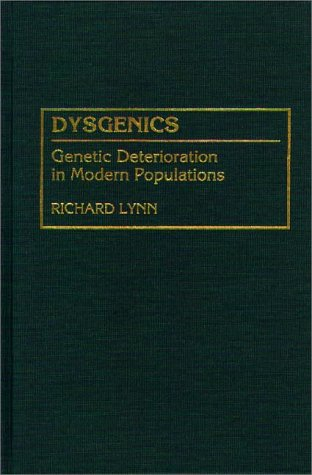
Dysgenics

In Dysgenics: Genetic Deterioration in Modern Populations (1996), Lynn reviewed the history of eugenics and dysgenics, from the early writings of Bénédict Morel and Francis Galton through the rise of eugenics in the early 20th century and its subsequent collapse. As a eugenicist himself, Lynn lists three concerns: deterioration in health, intelligence and conscientiousness. Lynn claims that, unlike modern societies, natural selection in pre-industrial societies favoured traits such as intelligence and "character".

According to Lynn, those with greater educational achievement have fewer children, while children with lower IQs come from larger families. Lynn claimed that twin studies provide evidence of a genetic basis for these differences. Lynn proposes that conscientiousness is heritable, and that criminals tend to have more offspring. Lynn agreed with Lewis Terman's comment in 1922 that "children of successful and cultivated parents test higher than children from wretched and ignorant homes for the simple reason that their heredity is better".

A review of Dysgenics by evolutionary biologist W. D. Hamilton, published posthumously in 2000 in the Annals of Human Genetics, praised the book and its endorsement of eugenics, saying "discussing the large bank of evidence that still accumulates on heritability of aptitudes and differentials of fertility, shows in this book that almost all of the worries of the early eugenicists were well-founded, in spite of the relative paucity of their evidence at the time".

Psychologist Nicholas Mackintosh, reviewing the book for the Journal of Biosocial Science in 2002, wrote that Lynn "argues that the ideas of the eugenicists were correct and that we ignore them at our peril". Mackintosh criticised Lynn for "not fully acknowledg[ing] the negative relationship between social class and education on the one hand, and infant mortality and life expectancy on the other". He questioned Lynn's interpretation of data, and pointed out that according to Lynn's reading of the theory of natural selection, "if it is true that those with lower IQ and less education are producing more offspring, then they are fitter than those of higher IQ and more education". According to Mackintosh, eugenicist arguments such as Lynn's are not based on a "biological imperative, but rather on a particular set of value judgements".

In Eugenics: A Reassessment (2001), Lynn claimed that embryo selection as a form of standard reproductive therapy would raise the average intelligence of the population by 15 IQ points in a single generation (p. 300). If couples produce a hundred embryos, he argues, the range in potential IQ would be around 15 points above and below the parents' IQ. Lynn argues that this gain could be repeated each generation, eventually stabilising the population's IQ at a theoretical maximum of around 200 after six or seven generations.

=== Race and national differences in intelligence ===
In the late 1970s, Lynn wrote that he found the average IQ of the Japanese to be 106.6, and that of Chinese people living in Singapore to be 110. Lynn's psychometric studies were cited in the 1994 book The Bell Curve and were criticised as part of the controversy surrounding that book. In his 2002 article, "Skin color and intelligence in African Americans", published in 2002 in Population and Environment, Lynn concluded that lightness of skin color in African Americans is positively correlated with IQ, which he claims derives from the higher proportion of Caucasian admixture. However, Lynn failed to control for childhood environmental factors that are related to intelligence, and his research was criticised by a subsequent article published in the journal by Mark E. Hill. The article concluded that "...[Lynn's] bivariate association disappears once childhood environmental factors are considered". In his response to Hill, Lynn wrote that "The conclusion that there is a true association between skin color and IQ is consistent with the hypothesis that genetic factors are partly responsible for the black–white difference in intelligence... the evidence that a statistically significant correlation is present confirms the genetic hypothesis". This statement was described by Marcus Feldman as "nonsensical".

In 2010 Earl B. Hunt summarized Lynn's research in this area along with that of Tatu Vanhanen, that he is "highly critical of their empirical work, and even more so of their interpretations", but that they "do deserve credit for raising important questions in a way that has resulted in interesting and important findings".

Lynn proposed the "cold winters theory" of the evolution of human intelligence, which postulates that intelligence evolved to greater degrees as an evolutionary adaptation to colder environments. According to this theory, cold environments produce a selective pressure for higher intelligence because they present cognitive demands not found in warmer environments, such as the need to find ways of keeping warm, and the stockpiling of food for winter. James Flynn has criticized this theory as being inconsistent with the global distribution of IQ scores. If the theory were correct, the people of Singapore, who originated primarily from China's southern Guangdong province, would possess a lower average IQ than the people of mainland China, when in fact the reverse is true. In 2012 Scott A. McGreal, writing for Psychology Today, described it as a just-so story, saying the theory fails to account for challenges specific to warmer environments, and also does not explain why hominids who evolved for millions of years in colder environments (such as Neanderthals and Homo erectus) did not also evolve similar intelligence.

In IQ and the Wealth of Nations (2002), Lynn and Vanhanen argued that differences in nations' per capita gross domestic product (GDP) are partially caused by IQ differences, meaning that certain nations are wealthier in part, because their citizens are more intelligent. K. Richardson wrote in the journal Heredity that "an association between IQ and national wealth is hardly surprising, though its causal direction is the opposite of that assumed by L&V. But I would not take the 'evidence' presented in this book to serve arguments either way." Other economists who reviewed the book also pointed to numerous flaws throughout the study, from unreliable IQ statistics for 81 of the 185 countries used in the analysis, to insecure estimates of the national IQ in the remaining 101 countries in the sample that did not have published IQ data. This was in addition to the highly unreliable GDP estimates for present-day developing countries and the even more unreliable historical data estimating GDP and national IQ dating back to the early 19th century, well before either concept even existed. Even the data on the 81 countries where direct evidence of IQ scores were actually available were highly problematic. For example, the data sets containing Surinamese, Ethiopian, and Mexican IQ scores were based on unrepresentative samples of children who had emigrated from their nation of birth to the Netherlands, Israel, and Argentina, respectively. In a book review for the Journal of Economic Literature, economist Thomas Nechyba wrote: "Such sweeping conclusions based on relatively weak statistical evidence and dubious presumptions seem misguided at best and quite dangerous if taken seriously. It is therefore difficult to find much to recommend in this book."

Lynn's 2006 Race Differences in Intelligence organises data on intelligence into ten population groups and (in the 2015 edition) covers over 500 published articles.

Lynn's meta-analysis lists the average IQ scores of East Asians (105), Europeans (99), the Inuit (91), Southeast Asians and indigenous peoples of the Americas each (87), Pacific Islanders (85), Middle Easterners, South Asians and North Africans each (84), East and West Africans (67), Australian Aborigines (62) and Bushmen and Pygmies (54).

Lynn has previously argued that nutrition is the best-supported environmental explanation for variation in the lower range, and a number of other environmental explanations have been advanced. In his 2011 book The Chosen People, Lynn offers largely genetic explanations for Ashkenazi Jewish intelligence (generally estimated at 107–115 IQ).

=== Sex differences in intelligence ===
Observing a correlation between brain size and measured IQ, Lynn postulated that men and women may have brains that are different in size in proportion with differences in body size. In 1994, Lynn formulated a developmental theory of sex differences in intelligence, postulating that girls would have a developmental advantage over boys at the ages of 9 to 14, but that boys would continue to develop and increase in mean IQ relative to girls from the age of 15 onwards. In 2004, Lynn and Irwing conducted a meta-analysis of 57 studies from 14 countries, reporting a male advantage in IQ (measured via Raven's Progressive Matrices) that begins to appear at the age of 15, eventually reaching an average of 5 IQ points at the ages of 20-29 and onwards.

In a 2006 study of Naglieri Nonverbal Ability Test results in 5-17 year olds, Johannes Rojahn and Jack Naglieri reported findings that demonstrate a female advantage in the 10-13 age group and a male advantage in 15- and 16-year-olds. However, the authors conclude that the disparities were smaller than predicted by Lynn and too small to be of practical importance.

In 2008, Lynn and Irwing proposed that since working memory ability correlates highest with g factor, researchers would have no choice but to accept greater male intelligence if differences on working memory tasks are found. As a result, a neuroimaging study published by Schmidt et al. (2009) conducted an investigation into this proposal by measuring sex differences on an n-back working memory task. The results found no sex difference in working memory capacity, thus contradicting the position put forward by Lynn and Irwing (2008). Roberto Colom and Paul M. Thompson, writing in The Wiley-Blackwell Handbook of Individual Differences, conclude based on the findings of Schmidt et al. and others that "there is no sex difference in working memory capacity".

=== Intranational intelligence variations ===
In a 2005 article, Lynn reported that Mexicans of European descent had an IQ of 98, Mestizos in Mexico had an IQ of 94, and indigenous peoples of Mexico had an IQ of 83, explaining the lower-than-expected IQ of Indians on their poor nutrition and other social factors.

In a 2010 article about IQ in Italy, Lynn contended that IQs are highest in the north (103 in Friuli-Venezia Giulia) and lowest in the south (89 in Sicily) and are correlated with average incomes, stature, infant mortality, literacy and education. The lack of any actual IQ test data (as Lynn used PISA score data) among other methodological issues and Lynn's consequent conclusions were criticised. Other large surveys in Italy have found much smaller differences in educational achievement. Several subsequent studies based on the direct assessment of IQs failed to report significant differences among Italian regions. On the contrary, the results from the Southern half of the country (103) are sometimes higher than those from the North Central regions (100–101).

In 2012 Lynn similarly claimed that southern Spaniards have lower IQs than northern Spaniards do and believes that this is because of Middle Eastern and North African genes in the South.

In a 2015 article published in Intelligence about the regional IQ differences in Turkey, Lynn, Sakar and Cheng analysed the PISA scores of NUTS-1 regions of the country and calculated the average IQ scores of said provinces, claiming there being a high correlation (r= .91) between the two metrics. The team took the average PISA score of UK as baseline to represent an IQ of 100. The paper concluded that the NUTS regions with the highest IQ average were West Marmara (97.7), East Marmara (97.4) and Central Anatolia (97.3), meanwhile the regions with the lowest scores were made up by Central East Anatolia (87.3) and Southeast Anatolia (86.3), respectively. The article suggested multiple theories to explain regional IQ disparity, such as historical migration to wealthier Western coastal areas having a eugenic effect on intelligence, or economic growth being inhibited by the mountainous terrain in the East, causing a negative effect on IQ. The paper compared the results of the study to those of Italy and US, citing a gross regional variation.

=== The Global Bell Curve, 2008 ===
The Global Bell Curve: Race, IQ and Inequality Worldwide is a book by Lynn, originally published Washington Summit Publishers in 2008. The book's stated purpose is to determine whether the racial and socioeconomic differences in the United States in average IQ, as originally claimed by the 1994 book The Bell Curve, also exist in other countries. Lynn's book claims that such differences exist in other countries, in addition to in the United States. It was reviewed favorably by researchers J. Philippe Rushton, Donald Templer in white nationalist publication The Occidental Quarterly, and Gerhard Meisenberg.

A less favorable review of the book was written by Wendy Johnson of the University of Edinburgh, who wrote in Intelligence, which had Lynn on its editorial board, that "... despite many possible statistical and psychometric quibbles, the data Lynn presents in this book are essentially correct. At the same time, despite Lynn's protestations to the contrary, these data do little or nothing to address the questions of why this is the case or whether the situation is inevitable or permanent. Like the other theorists he criticizes, Lynn confuses correlation with causation."

== Pioneer Fund ==
Lynn served on the board of directors of the Pioneer Fund and was also on the editorial board of the Pioneer-supported journal Mankind Quarterly, both of which have been the subject of controversy for their dealing with race and intelligence and eugenics and have been accused of racism, e.g., by Avner Falk and William Tucker. Lynn's Ulster Institute for Social Research received $609,000 in grants from the Pioneer Fund between 1971 and 1996.

Lynn's 2001 book The Science of Human Diversity: A History of the Pioneer Fund is a history and defence of the fund, in which he argues that, for the last 60 years, it has been "nearly the only non-profit foundation making grants for study and research into individual and group differences and the hereditary basis of human nature ... Over those 60 years, the research funded by Pioneer has helped change the face of social science."

== Reception ==
Lynn's review work on global racial differences in cognitive ability has been cited for misrepresenting the research of other scientists and has been criticised for unsystematic methodology and distortion.

In 1994, Charles Lane criticised Lynn's methodology in his article in The New York Review of Books, "The Tainted Sources of The Bell Curve" (1994). Pioneer Fund president Harry Weyher Jr. published a response accusing the reviewer of errors and misrepresentation; Lane also replied to this with a rebuttal.

In 1995 psychologist Leon Kamin faulted Lynn in a critical review of The Bell Curve, for "disregarding scientific objectivity", "misrepresenting data", and for "racism". Kamin argues that the studies of cognitive ability of Africans in Lynn's meta-analysis cited by Richard Herrnstein and Charles Murray show strong cultural bias. Kamin also reproached Lynn for concocting IQ values from test scores that have no correlation to IQ. Kamin also noted that Lynn excluded a study that found no difference in white and black performance, and ignored the results of a study which showed black scores were higher than white scores.

In 2002, David King, the coordinator of the consumer watchdog group Human Genetics Alert, said: "we find Richard Lynn's claims that some human beings are inherently superior to others repugnant". In 2003, Gavin Evans wrote in The Guardian that Lynn was one of a number of "flat-earthers" who have claimed that "Africans, or black Americans, or poor people" are less intelligent than Westerners. He further wrote, with regard to Lynn's claims that Africans are less intelligent than Westerners, "What is remarkable in all this is not so much that there are people who believe him – after all, there are still those who insist the Earth is flat – but rather that any creditable institution should take it seriously."

The datum that Lynn and Vanhanen used for the lowest IQ estimate, Equatorial Guinea, was taken from a group of children in a home for developmentally disabled children in Spain. Corrections were applied to adjust for differences in IQ cohorts (the "Flynn" effect) on the assumption that the same correction could be applied internationally, without regard to the cultural or economic development level of the country involved. While there appears to be rather little evidence on cohort effect upon IQ across the developing countries, one study in Kenya (Daley, Whaley, Sigman, Espinosa, & Neumann, 2003) shows a substantially larger cohort effect than is reported for developed countries.

In 2002 an academic dispute arose after Lynn claimed that some races are inherently more psychopathic than others, and other psychologists criticised his data and interpretations. Kamin said that "Lynn's distortions and misrepresentations of the data constitute a truly venomous racism, combined with the scandalous disregard for scientific objectivity".

In 2006, John P. Jackson Jr., of the University of Colorado, Boulder, disputed Lynn's claim in The Science of Human Diversity that the Pioneer Fund was dedicated to funding objective scientific research. Jackson wrote that "... although the Pioneer Fund may not have endorsed any policy proposal officially, it has funded a group that is remarkably uniform in its opposition to school integration, immigration, and affirmative action". In 2010, on his 80th birthday, Lynn was celebrated with a special issue of Personality and Individual Differences dedicated to his work that was edited by Danish psychologist Helmuth Nyborg with contributions by Nyborg, J. Philippe Rushton, Satoshi Kanazawa and several others.

In February 2018, the Ulster University students' union issued a motion calling for the university to revoke Lynn's title as emeritus professor. The motion argued that Lynn's title should be revoked because he has made statements that are "racist and sexist in nature". The university agreed to this request in April 2018.

== Allegations of racism ==
Lynn is listed by the Southern Poverty Law Center (SPLC) in their extremist files as a white nationalist. The SPLC has kept a record of Lynn's controversial statements: for example, in a 2011 interview with then far-right artist Alex Kurtagić, Lynn stated: "I am deeply pessimistic about the future of the European peoples because mass immigration of third world peoples will lead to these becoming majorities in the United States and westernmost Europe during the present century. I think this will mean the destruction of European civilization in these countries." In 1995, Lynn was quoted by the media watchdog group Fairness & Accuracy in Reporting (FAIR) saying: "What is called for here is not genocide, the killing off of the population of incompetent cultures. But we do need to think realistically in terms of the 'phasing out' of such peoples ... Evolutionary progress means the extinction of the less competent. To think otherwise is mere sentimentality."

FAIR also quoted Lynn as having stated in an interview with the right-wing British political magazine Right NOW!:

I think the only solution lies in the breakup of the United States. Blacks and Hispanics are concentrated in the Southwest, the Southeast and the East, but the Northwest and the far Northeast, Maine, Vermont and upstate New York have a large predominance of whites. I believe these predominantly white states should declare independence and secede from the Union. They would then enforce strict border controls and provide minimum welfare, which would be limited to citizens. If this were done, white civilisation would survive within this handful of states.

The SPLC stated that "for 50 years, Richard Lynn has been at the forefront of scientific racism", that "he argues that the nations with the highest IQs must subjugate or eliminate the lower-IQ groups within their borders in order to preserve their dominance". The centre has also stated that "Lynn uses his authority as professor (emeritus) of psychology at the University of Ulster to argue for the genetic inferiority of non-white people."

Lynn was a frequent speaker at conferences hosted by the white-nationalist publication American Renaissance.

== Death ==
On 23 July 2023, it was announced that Lynn had died. He was 93.

== Works ==
- Lynn, Richard (1997). Dysgenics: Genetic Deterioration in Modern Populations (PDF). Praeger Publishers. ISBN 978-0-275-94917-4.
- Lynn, Richard (2001). The Science of Human Diversity: A History of the Pioneer Fund. University Press of America. ISBN 0-7618-2040-X.
- Lynn, Richard (2001). Eugenics: A Reassessment (PDF). Praeger Publishers. ISBN 978-0-275-95822-0.
- Lynn, Richard; Vanhanen, Tatu (2002). IQ and the Wealth of Nations. Westport, Connecticut: Praeger. ISBN 978-0-275-97510-4.
- Lynn; Vanhanen (2006). IQ and Global Inequality. Washington Summit Publishers. ISBN 1-59368-025-2.
- Lynn, Richard; Vanhanen, Tatu (2012). Intelligence: A Unifying Construct for the Social Sciences (PDF). Ulster: Ulster Institute for Social Research. ISBN 978-0-9568811-7-5.
- Lynn, Richard (2015) [2006]. Race Differences in Intelligence: An Evolutionary Analysis (PDF). Washington Summit Publishers. ISBN 978-1-59368-019-0.
- Lynn, Richard; Becker, David (2019). The Intelligence of Nations (PDF). London: Ulster Institute for Social Research. ISBN 978-0-9930001-5-7.
- Lynn, Richard; Dutton, Edward (2019). Race Differences in Psychopathic Personality: An Evolutionary Analysis. Augusta, Georgia: Washington Summit Publishers. ISBN 978-1-59368-062-6.
- Lynn, Richard (2020). Memoirs of a Dissident Psychologist. Ulster Institute for Social Research. ISBN 978-0-9930001-7-1.
- Lynn, Richard (2021). Sex Differences in Intelligence: The Developmental Theory. Arktos Media Ltd. ISBN 978-1-914208-65-2.
