= Satoshi Kanazawa =

American-born British evolutionary psychologist (born 1962)

- Born: 1962; United States
- Education: University of Arizona
- Scientific career
- Fields: Evolutionary psychology
- Workplaces: London School of Economics

Satoshi Kanazawa (born 1962) is an American-born British evolutionary psychologist and writer. He is currently Reader in Management at the London School of Economics. Kanazawa's comments and research on race and intelligence, health and intelligence, multiculturalism, and the relationship between physical attractiveness and intelligence have led to condemnation from observers and colleagues. Critics have described his claims as pseudoscientific and racist.

In response to ongoing controversies over his stated views, such as that Sub-Saharan Black African countries suffer from chronic poverty and disease because their people have lower IQs, and that black women are objectively less attractive than women of other races, he was dismissed from writing for Psychology Today, and his employer, the London School of Economics, prohibited him from publishing in non-peer-reviewed outlets for 12 months. A group of 68 evolutionary psychologists issued an open letter titled "Kanazawa's bad science does not represent evolutionary psychology" rejecting his views, and an article on the same theme was published by 35 academics in American Psychologist.

== Life and career ==
Kanazawa received his PhD in 1994 from the University of Arizona.

Kanazawa began working at the London School of Economics in 2003.

== Views, publications and controversies ==
=== General ===
Kanazawa has co-written three books with Alan Miller:

- Why Beautiful People Have More Daughters: From Dating, Shopping, and Praying to Going to War and Becoming a Billionaire—Two Evolutionary Psychologists Explain Why We Do What We Do
- Why Men Gamble and Women Buy Shoes: How Evolution Shaped the Way We Behave
- Order by Accident: The Origins and Consequences of Conformity in Contemporary Japan

He also wrote a blog, The Scientific Fundamentalist, for Psychology Today until his dismissal in 2011.

In 2003, in an article in the Journal of Research in Personality, he claimed to show that scientists generally made their biggest discoveries before their mid-30s, and compared this productivity curve to that of criminals.

=== Attractiveness and sex of offspring ===
In 2006, he published an article in the Journal of Theoretical Biology, claiming that attractive people are 26% less likely to have male offspring. In a letter to the editors regarding Kanazawa's claim that attractive people are more likely to have daughters, Columbia statistician Andrew Gelman points out that a correct interpretation of the regression coefficients in Kanazawa's analysis is that attractive people are 8% more likely to have girls, an error that Kanazawa acknowledges. Gelman argues that Kanazawa's analysis does not convincingly show causality, because of possible endogeneity as well as problematic interpretations of statistical significance in multiple comparisons. While Kanazawa claims that the former error is "merely linguistic" and that he addressed the latter two in his initial article, Gelman maintains that his original criticism remains valid.

=== Race and attractiveness ===
In May 2011, he published an article in Psychology Today that explored why black women had been rated less attractive than women of other races in the National Longitudinal Study of Adolescent Health. Subsequent critical independent analysis of the results showed that the difference in assessed attractiveness held for three of the four data sets in the National Longitudinal Study of Adolescent Health and that there was only a statistically significant race difference in younger women and that it disappeared by early adulthood. Applying his same reasoning to males, Kanazawa also concluded in his article that black men would generally be considered more attractive than black women. Kanazawa was also criticised for arguing that the common factor of subjective interviewer ratings of attractiveness used in his analysis constitutes an objective scale of attractiveness.

The article caused outrage and was widely criticised. The first criticisms were published in the blogosphere leading to the creation of petitions on Change.org and Facebook to have Kanazawa fired. Some published criticism, including a joint statement issued by a group of evolutionary psychologists, came from other scientists, distancing the discipline of evolutionary psychology from Kanazawa's research. Psychology Today pulled the article; on 27 May 2011, they issued an apology to anyone who had been offended and stated that they had not reviewed Kanazawa's article before its publication and that they would police more strictly for controversial content in the future.

In September 2011, Kanazawa apologised to LSE director Judith Rees, saying he "deeply regrets" the "unintended consequences" of the blog and accepting that "some of [his] arguments may have been flawed and not supported by the available evidence". An internal LSE investigation found that Kanazawa had brought the school into disrepute and prohibited him from publishing in non-peer-reviewed outlets for a year. Following the controversy, an open letter was signed by 68 evolutionary psychologists distancing themselves from Kanazawa and defending evolutionary psychology, writing "The principle of applying evolutionary theory to the study of human psychology and behaviour is sound, and there is a great deal of high-quality, nuanced, culturally-sensitive evolutionary research ongoing in the UK and elsewhere today". In response, 23 scientists published a letter in Times Higher Education defending Kanazawa's work.

=== Correlation of health and intelligence ===
Kanazawa has used the term Savanna principle to denote his hypothesis that societal difficulties exist because "the human brain" evolved in Africa hundreds of thousands of years ago, a drastically different environment from today's urban, industrial society. In 2006, Kanazawa used this principle to explain the correlation of health and IQ vs. health and wealth. He argued that IQ is a better predictor for health than wealth or inequality in most regions of the world, except in Sub-Saharan Africa, where health is more strongly correlated to wealth than to IQ. He claimed that this was because Sub-Saharan Africa represents an "evolutionarily familiar" environment with lesser selection pressure on IQ than elsewhere. In a criticism of the paper, George Ellison (2007) argued that the conclusion was based on "flawed assumptions, questionable data, inappropriate analysis and biased interpretations".

=== Homosexuality and intelligence ===
According to neuroscientist Simon LeVay, an early review in academic literature suggested that gays and lesbians were more intelligent than their peers, although this may have suffered from volunteer bias. In 2012, however, Kanazawa published an analysis of three large-scale randomly sampled studies from the U.S. and U.K., and found that in both males and females, homosexuals scored higher for intelligence. LeVay writes that these findings are "suggestive" of a link between homosexuality and intelligence, but notes that smarter people may be more likely to be open about their sexuality than less intelligent people, so these results may also suffer from bias.

=== Muslims, terrorism and Psychology Today ===
In his blog The Scientific Fundamentalist, hosted by Psychology Today, Kanazawa published often on Muslims, Islam and the Middle East. The publication Psychology Today later received a significant amount of negative but constructive feedback and criticism following some of Kanazawa's more controversial articles.

On 6 March 2008, in the article subtitled "All you need is hate", he suggested a "little thought experiment", asking his readers to "[i]magine that, on September 11, 2001, when the Twin Towers came down, the President of the United States was not George W. Bush, but Ann Coulter. What would have happened then? On September 12, President Coulter would have ordered the US military forces to drop 35 nuclear bombs throughout the Middle East, killing all of our actual and potential enemy combatants, and their wives and children. On September 13, the war would have been over and won, without a single American life lost". He concludes, "[y]es, we need a woman in the White House, but not the one who's running", suggesting that in his opinion someone like Ann Coulter is preferable.

On 10 January 2010, he posted an article titled "What's Wrong with Muslims?" In it, he claims that Muslims "are all united in their values and goals by their singular identity of being Muslims", and that although it may be "tempting to dismiss these observations", and "politically correct and comforting" to say that terrorists are 'extremists' or 'jihadists', that would be "factually inaccurate", he claims. He further elaborated on his views seven days later, on 17 January, in another article on the same website. In its intro he claims that "Racial profiling works and saves lives". Although, at some point through this article, he dismisses an Islamophobic stereotype expressed through the media trope "Not all Muslims are terrorists, but all terrorists are Muslims", but follows it with one of his own, writing: "half of Muslims worldwide are terrorists or active supporters of terrorism, who would encourage their sons, brothers, and nephews to blow themselves up."

In the article titled "Is Your Professor an Islamophobe?", at the time Columbia University epidemiologist and HuffPost contributor, Abdul El-Sayed, quoted Kanazawa's articles, along with some other authors', when he discussed the phenomenon of "a growing number of academics using [their] intellectual identity to promote intolerance and xenophobia against Islam and Muslims". El-Sayed expressed concern that, as he writes, "the fundamental messages portrayed in the public musings of academics are no different from the crude ramblings of a Glenn Beck or a Rush Limbaugh, they are many times more damaging". He explains how "PhDs and daunting lists of academic publications to their names, academics are perceived to carry the weighty, objective backing of 'knowledge' and 'science' by the lay-public, so bigoted, ignorant opinions on their parts are taken as justification to those who already hold skewed perspectives and hateful opinions about Islam and Muslims. Thus these academic dogmatists cloak (perhaps under their PhD hoods) the fire of Islamophobia with the cool, measured tones of objectivity."

Nanjala Nyabola, writing in The Guardian in response to Kanazawa's article purporting to explain why black women are less attractive, dismissed his claims as "racist nonsense". She questioned Psychology Today's role in publishing his articles, criticizing the publication's repeated failures to reject his "offensive tripe" as well as their initial response to the backlash his article produced, which was to edit its title rather than take it down entirely. Mikhail Lyubansky, a writer for Psychology Today, praised the publication's editorial decision to remove Kanazawa's post, writing "[t]his isn't censorship ... It's socially responsible publishing and editing." Similarly, Christopher Ryan criticized Kanazawa's views and writings, calling him the "Rush Limbaugh of Evolutionary Psychology", noting that "if Rush Limbaugh, Bill O'Reilly, or Ann Coulter had studied science, they'd be penning articles like some of Kanazawa's."

== Universities and engagements controversies ==
A group of 68 evolutionary psychologists issued an open letter titled "Kanazawa's bad science does not represent evolutionary psychology" rejecting his views, and an article on the same theme was published by 35 academics in American Psychologist.

- In May 2011 and in the wake of his latest blogging incident, the University of London Union Senate subsequently unanimously voted to condemn his research.
- In February 2008, he started a blog on Psychology Today called "The Scientific Fundamentalist". In June 2011, the publication dismissed Kanazawa for good in reaction to his "Why Are Black Women Less Physically Attractive Than Other Women?" article.
- In September 2011, London School of Economics (LSE) suspended Kanazawa from publishing any material in non-peer reviewed journals for a year and he issued an apology stating that the post was "flawed".
- In September 2012, after the period of 12 months when he was prohibited from publishing in non-peer-reviewed outlets by the LSE, he was hired by the blog Big Think as a contributing editor; the co-operation was discontinued on 29 March 2013.
- In 2018, J. Michael Bailey invited Satoshi Kanazawa to Northwestern University as a visiting scholar. In December 2018, students at Northwestern University gathered more than 4,000 signatures on a petition in a few days, asking the university to overturn Kanazawa's approved application to conduct research in Evanston. According to one report, other professors said they were blindsided by Bailey's invitation, and that Bailey got the two other required signatures for the invitation from people unaware of Kanazawa's history.

== See also ==
- Nations and intelligence
