= Jelte Wicherts =

Dutch psychologist and professor (born 1976)

Jelte Michiel Wicherts (born September 13, 1976) is a Dutch psychologist and a professor in the Tilburg School of Social and Behavioral Sciences at Tilburg University. His research interests include biases in decision-making, as well as scientific misconduct and reproducibility. He has also studied group differences in IQ scores and the Flynn effect.

Together with van Marcel van Assen he runs the Meta-Research Center at his university. Work by the group on Statcheck has been featured in The Guardian.

He was born in Amersfoort.

== Education ==
Wicherts received his master's degree in psychological methods from the University of Amsterdam in 2002, where he received his Ph.D. in psychological methods in 2007. His Ph.D. thesis was entitled Group differences in intelligence test performance, and his primary Ph.D. supervisor was Conor Dolan.
