= Causes of intelligence =

Impact on human intelligence

Causes of intelligence research investigates the impact of various influences on intelligence, as measured by IQ test scores and other indicators of cognitive ability. The environment and its interaction with genes account for a high proportion of the variation in intelligence between individual young children, and for a small proportion of the variation observed in mature adults. Historically, there has been great interest in the field of intelligence research to determine environmental influences on the development of cognitive functioning, in particular, fluid intelligence, as defined by its stabilization at 16 years of age. Despite the fact that intelligence stabilizes in early adulthood it is thought that genetic factors come to play more of a role in our intelligence during middle and old age and that the importance of the environment dissipates.

== Neurological theory ==
As babies, our neuronal connections are completely undifferentiated. Neurons make connections with neighboring neurons, and these become more complex and more idiosyncratic as the child ages, up until the age of 16, when this process halts. This is also the time frame for development of what is defined in psychometric studies as the general factor of intelligence, or g, as measured by IQ tests. A person's IQ is supposed to be relatively stable after they have reached maturity. It is likely that the growth in neuronal connections is largely due to an interaction with the environment, as there is not even enough genetic material to code for all the possible neural connections. Even if there was enough genetic material to code neural connections, it is unlikely that they could produce such fine tuned connections. In contrast the environment causes meaningful processing as the neurons adapt to stimuli presented.

The capacity of the brain to adapt its connections to environmental stimuli diminishes over time, and therefore it would follow that there is a critical period for intellectual development as well. While the critical period for the visual cortex ends in early childhood, other cortical areas and abilities have a critical period that lasts up through maturity (age 16), the same time frame for the development of fluid intelligence. In order for a person to develop certain intellectual abilities, they need to be provided with the appropriate environmental stimuli during childhood, before the critical period for adapting their neuronal connections ends. The existence of a critical period of language development is well established. A case illustrating this critical period is that of E.M., a young man who was born profoundly deaf and did not have any interaction with the deaf community. At the age of 15 he was fitted with hearing aids and taught Spanish; however, after 4 years he still had severe difficulties in verbal comprehension and production.

Some researchers believe that the critical period effect is a result of the manner by which intellectual abilities are acquired—that changes in neuronal connections inhibit or prevent possible future changes. However, the critical period is observed at approximately the same age in all people, no matter what level of intellectual ability is achieved.

== Environmental influence ==
=== Sociocultural ===
Various non-genetic factors such as family (upbringing), peer group, and education apparently correlate with differences in IQ.

==== Family ====
Having access to resources of the home, and having a home life conducive to learning is definitely associated with scores on intelligence tests. However, it is difficult to disentangle possible genetic factors from a parent's attitude or use of language, for example.

A child's ordinal position in their family has also been shown to affect intelligence. A number of studies have indicated that as birth order increases IQ decreases with first borns having especially superior intelligence. Many explanations for this have been proposed but the most widely accepted idea is that first borns receive more attention and resources from parents and are expected to focus on task achievement, whereas later borns are more focused on sociability.

The type and amount of praise received from family can also affect how intelligence develops. Research by Dweck and colleagues suggests that feedback to a child on their academic achievements can alter their future intelligence scores. Telling a child that they are intelligent and praising them for this 'intrinsic' quality indicates that intelligence is fixed, known as entity theory. Children holding the entity theory of ability have been reported as performing less well after a failure, perhaps because they believe that failure on a task indicates that they are not intelligent, and that therefore there is no point in trying to challenge themselves after failure. Dweck contrasts this with incremental theory beliefs – the idea that intelligence can be improved upon with effort. Children who hold this theory are more likely to develop a love for learning rather than for achievement. Parents who praise the child's effort at a task rather than the result are more likely to instill this incremental theory of intelligence in their children and thus to improve their intelligence.

==== Socioeconomic status ====
A study (1999) by Capron and Duyme of French children adopted between the ages of four and six examined the influence of socioeconomic status (SES). The children's IQs initially averaged 77. Most were abused or neglected as infants, then shunted from one foster home or institution to the next. Nine years later after adoption, when they were on average 14 years old, they retook the IQ tests, and all of them did better. The amount they improved was directly related to the adopting family's socioeconomic status. "Children adopted by farmers and laborers had average IQ scores of 85.5; those placed with middle-class families had average scores of 92. The average IQ scores of youngsters placed in well-to-do homes climbed more than 20 points, to 98."

==== Peer group ====
JR Harris suggested in The Nurture Assumption that an individual's peer group influences their intelligence greatly over time, and that different peer group characteristics may be responsible for the black-white IQ gap. Several longitudinal studies support the conjecture that peer groups significantly affect scholastic achievement, but relatively few studies have examined the effect on tests of cognitive ability.

The peer group an individual identifies with can also influence intelligence through the stereotypes associated with that group. The stereotype threat, first introduced by Claude Steele, is the idea that people belonging to a stereotyped group may perform poorly in a situation where the stereotype is relevant. This has been shown to be a factor in differences in intelligence test scores between different ethnic groups, men and women, people of low and high social status and young and old participants. For example, females who were told that women are worse at chess than men, performed worse in a game of chess than females who were not told this.

==== Education ====
IQ and educational attainment are strongly correlated (estimates range form .40 to over .60.) There is controversy, however, as to whether education affects intelligence – it may be both a dependent and independent variable with regard to IQ. A study by Ceci illustrates the numerous ways in which education can affect intelligence. It was found that; IQ decreases during summer breaks from schooling, children with delayed school entry have lower IQs, those who drop out of education earlier have lower IQs and children of the same age but of one years less schooling have lower IQ scores. Thus it is difficult to unravel the interconnected relationship of IQ and education where both seem to affect one another.

Those who do better on childhood intelligence tests tend to have a lower drop out rate, and complete more years of school and are predictive of school success. For instance, one of the largest ever studies found a correlation of 0.81 between the general intelligence or g-factor and GCSE results. On the other hand, education has been shown to improve performance on intelligence tests. Research controlling for childhood IQ and treating years of education as a causal variable suggests that education causes an increase in total IQ score, although general intelligence was not affected.

For instance a natural experiment in Norway where the school leaving age was changed suggested that IQ was raised by additional year of school. School may alter specific knowledge, rather than general ability or biological speed. In terms of what matters about school, it appears that simple quantity or years-in-school may be what underpins the linkage of education with performance on IQ tests.

==== Training and interventions ====
Research on the effectiveness of interventions, and the degree to which fluid intelligence can be increased, especially after age 16, is somewhat controversial. Fluid intelligence is typically thought of as something more innate, and defined as immutable after maturity. One recent article however, demonstrates that, at least for a period of time, fluid intelligence can be increased through training in increasing an adult's working memory capacity. Working memory capacity is defined as the ability to remember something temporarily, like remembering a phone number just long enough to dial it.

In an experiment, groups of adults were first assessed using standard tests for fluid intelligence. Then they trained groups for four different numbers of days, for half an hour each day, using an n-back exercise that worked on improving one's working memory. It supposedly does so through a few different components, involving having to ignore irrelevant items, manage tasks simultaneously, and monitor performance on exercise, while connecting related items. After this training, the groups were tested again and those with training (compared against control groups who did not undergo training) showed significant increases in performance on the fluid intelligence tests.

A study by Blackwell et al. found that they could improve a child's mathematics achievement depending on which theory of intelligence they were taught; incremental or entity theory. Entity theory supposes that intelligence is fixed and cannot be altered by working harder. Incremental theory on the other hand assumes that intelligence is malleable and can be developed and improved with effort. Over the course of a year they found that students who had been taught the incremental theory of intelligence showed an upward trajectory in grades in mathematics throughout the year whereas those who had been taught entity theory showed no improvement. This indicates that teaching incremental theory may improve performance on academic tasks, though further research is needed to investigate whether the same results can be found for general intelligence.

Other studies have looked at improving intelligence and preventing cognitive decline by using cognition enhancing substances known as nootropics. One such study gave participants a number of known nootropics in combination in the hopes of targeting numerous cellular mechanisms and increasing the effects on cognition that each would have if administered individually. They conducted a double blind test and administered the combination treatment or placebo to adults for 28 days. They administered Raven's Advanced Progressive Matrices as a measure of intelligence on the first day and after 28 days. The results indicated a significant improvement in performance for those who had taken the treatment compared to those taking the placebo. The effect was equivalent to an increase in IQ of around 6 points.

==== Environmental enrichment ====
Environmental enrichment affects cognition and intellectual development from a neurobiological perspective. More stimulating environments can increase the number of synapses in the brain which increases synaptic activity. In humans this is most likely to occur during the development of the brain but can also occur in adults. Most of the research on environmental enrichment has been carried out on non human animals. In an experiment, four different habitats were set up to test how environmental enrichment or relative impoverishment affected rats' performance on various measures of intelligent behavior. First, rats were isolated, each to its own cage. In a second condition, the rats were still in isolation, but this time they had some toy, or enriching object in the cage with them. The third condition placed the rats in cages with each other, so they were receiving social enrichment, without any enriching object. The fourth and final condition exposed the rats to both social interaction and some form of object enrichment.

In measuring intellectual capacity, the rats who had both forms of enrichment performed best, the ones with social enrichment performed second best, and the ones with a toy in their cage performed still better than the rats with no toy or other rats. When the volume of the rat's cortices was measured the amount of enrichment again correlated with larger volume, which is an indicator of more synaptic connections, and greater intelligence. Attaining this sort of information in humans would be difficult as it requires histological research.

However, studies where environmental deprivation has occurred provide insight and indicate that a lack of stimulation can lead to cognitive impairment. Further research using educational attainment as an indicator of cognitive stimulation have found that those with higher levels of education show fewer signs of cognitive aging and that stimulating environments could be used in the treatment of cognitive aging dysfunctions such as dementia.

== Biological influences ==
=== Nutrition ===
Nutrition has been shown to affect intelligence prenatally and postnatally. The idea that prenatal nutrition may affect intelligence comes from Barker's hypothesis of fetal programming, which states that during critical stages of development the intrauterine environment affects or 'programmes' how the child will develop. Barker cited nutrition as being one of the most important intrauterine influences affecting development and that under-nutrition could permanently change the physiology and development of the child. It has been shown that under-nutrition, particularly protein malnutrition, can lead to irregular brain maturation and learning disabilities.

As prenatal nutrition is difficult to measure, birth weight has been used as a surrogate marker of nutrition in many studies. Birth weight needs to be corrected for gestational length to ensure that the effects are due to nutrition and not prematurity. The first longitudinal study looking at the effects of under-nutrition, as measured by birth weight, and intelligence focused on males who were born during the Dutch famine. The results indicated that there were no effects of under-nutrition on intellectual development. However, many studies since have found a significant relationship and a meta-analysis by Shenkin and colleagues indicates that birth weight is associated with scores on intelligence tests in childhood.

Post-natal malnutrition can also have a significant influence on intellectual development. This relationship has been harder to establish because the issue of malnutrition is often conflated with socioeconomic issues. However, it has been demonstrated in a few studies where pre-schoolers in two Guatemalan villages (where undernourishment is common) were given protein nutrition supplements for several years, and even in the lowest socioeconomic class, those children showed an increase in performance on intelligence tests, relative to controls with no dietary supplement.

Malnutrition has been shown to affect organizational processes of the brain such as neurogenesis, synaptic pruning, cell migration and cellular differentiation. This thus results in abnormalities in the formation of neural circuits and the development of neurotransmitter systems. However, some of these effects of malnutrition have been shown to be improved upon with a good diet and environment. Early nutrition can also affect brain structures that are actually correlated to IQ levels. Specifically, the caudate nucleus is particularly affected by early environmental factors and its volume correlates with IQ. In an experiment by Isaacs et al., infants born prematurely were either assigned a standard or high-nutrient diet during the weeks directly after birth. When the individuals were assessed later in adolescence, it was found that the high-nutrient group had significantly larger caudate volumes and scored significantly higher on verbal IQ tests. This study also found that the extent to which the caudate volume size related selectively to verbal IQ was much greater in male participants, and not very significant in females. This may help explain the finding in other earlier research that the effects of early diet on intelligence are more predominant in males.

Another study done by Lucas et al. confirms the conclusions about the importance of nutrition in the cognitive development of individuals born prematurely. It also found that the cognitive function of males was significantly more impaired by poorer postnatal nutrition. A unique finding however, was that there was a higher incidence of cerebral palsy in the individuals who were fed the non-nutrient enhanced formula.

Breast feeding has long been purported to supply important nutrients to infants and has been correlated with increased cognitive gains later in childhood. The link between intelligence and breast feeding has even been shown to persist into adulthood. However, this view has been challenged in recent times by studies which have found no such link between breast feeding and cognitive abilities. A meta-analysis by Der, Batty and Deary concluded that there was no link between IQ and breastfeeding when maternal intelligence had been accounted for and that mothers' intelligence is likely to be the link between breastfeeding and intelligence.

Other studies have indicated that breast feeding may be particularly important for children born Small for Gestational Age (SGA). A study by Slykerman et al. found that there was no association between breast feeding and higher intelligence in their full sample but that when looking only at SGA babies there was a significant increase in intelligence for those who had been breastfed over those who had not.

A 2007 study provides a possible resolution to the different results found across studies investigating breastfeeding's effect on intelligence. Caspi et al. found that whether breast feeding increased IQ was linked to whether the infant had a certain variant of the FADS2 gene. Children with the C variant of the gene showed an IQ advantage of 7 points when breastfed, whereas those with the GG variant showed no IQ advantages with breastfeeding. However, other studies have failed to replicate this result.

Certain single-gene metabolic disorders can severely affect intelligence. Phenylketonuria is an example, with publications documenting the capacity of treated phenylketonuria to produce a reduction of 10 IQ points on average. Meta-analyses have found that environmental factors, such as iodine deficiency, can result in large reductions in average IQ; iodine deficiency has been shown to produce a reduction of 12.5 IQ points on average.

=== Sleep ===
The effects of sleep deprivation on intelligence performance have been studied.

=== Stress ===
Maternal stress levels may affect the developing child's intelligence. The timing and duration of stress can greatly alter the fetus' brain development which can have long-term effects on intelligence. Maternal reactions to stress such as increased heart rate are dampened during pregnancy in order to protect the fetus. The impact of stress can be seen across many different species and can be an indicator of the outside environment which can help the fetus to adapt for surviving in the outside world. However, not all maternal stress has been perceived as bad as some has been seen to induce advantageous adaptions.

Stress during early childhood may also affect the child's development and have negative consequences on neural systems underlying fluid intelligence. A 2006 study found that IQ scores were related to the number of traumas and symptoms of post traumatic stress disorder (PTSD) in children and adults. Similarly, another study found that exposure to violence in the community and the subsequent distress, were related to a significant decrease in intelligence scores and reading abilities in children aged 6–7 years. Exposure to violence in the community had similar cognitive effects as experiencing childhood maltreatment or trauma.

=== Maternal age ===
Maternal age has been shown to be related to intelligence with younger mothers tending have children of lower intelligence than older mothers. However, this relationship may be non-linear with older mothers being at increased risk of giving birth to children with down syndrome which greatly affects cognitive abilities.

=== Exposure to toxic chemicals and other substances ===
Lead exposure has been proven to have significant effects on the intellectual development of a child. In a long-term study done by Baghurst et al. 1992, children who grew up next to a lead-smelting plant had significantly lower intelligence test scores, negatively correlated with their blood-lead level exposure. Even though lead levels have been reduced in our environment, some areas in the United States, particularly inner cities, are still at risk for exposing their children.

Furthermore, prenatal exposure to alcohol can greatly affect a child's performance on intelligence tests, and their intellectual growth. At high doses, fetal alcohol syndrome can develop, which causes intellectual disabilities, as well as other physical symptoms, such as head and face deformities, heart defects and slow growth. It is estimated that 1 in 1,000 babies born in the general population are born with fetal alcohol syndrome, as a result of heavy use of alcohol during pregnancy.

However, studies have shown that even at slightly less severe doses, prenatal exposure to alcohol can still affect the intelligence of the child in development, without having the full syndrome. Through a study done by Streissguth, Barr, Sampson, Darby, and Martin in 1989, it was shown that moderate prenatal doses of alcohol, defined as the mother ingesting 1.5 oz. daily, lowered children's test scores by 4 point below control levels, by the age of four. They also showed that prenatal exposure to aspirin and antibiotics is correlated with lower performance on intelligence tests as well. However, more recent studies have found that low to moderate alcohol consumption is not associated with children's intelligence scores. This contradictory evidence could perhaps be explained by findings that the effects of alcohol may depend on the genetic makeup of the fetus. In a recent study Lewis et al., looked at alcohol dehydrogenase genes and their mutations, which humans can have between 0 and 10. These mutations slow the breakdown of alcohol so the more mutations the fetus has the slower they will breakdown alcohol. They found that in children whose mothers had drunk moderately, those children with four or more mutations performed worse on an intelligence test than those with two or less mutations.

In another study, prenatal drug exposure was shown to have significantly negative effects on cognitive functioning, as measured at the age of five, compared again controls matched for socioeconomic status and inner-city environment. The researchers concluded that prenatally drug-exposed children are at greater risk for learning difficulties and attention problems in school, and therefore should be the subject of interventions to support educational success. It could be hypothesized that the effect of these drugs on the development of the brain prenatally, and axon guidance could be the root of the negative consequences on later deficits in intellectual development.

Specifically, prenatal exposure to marijuana affects development of intelligence later in childhood, in a nonlinear fashion, with the degree of exposure. Heavy use by the mother within the first trimester is associated with lower verbal reasoning scores on the Stanford-Binet Intelligence Scale; heavy use during the second trimester is associated with deficits in composite, short-term memory as well as lower quantitative scores on the test; high exposure in third trimester associated with lower quantitative scores as well. A study by Fried and Smith indicated that marijuana exposure did not lead to a decrease in global intelligence but that it did lead to problems with executive functions in childhood. However, another study found that when influences such as maternal age, mother's personality and home environment, there was no longer a difference between children exposed to marijuana and those not exposed with relation to executive functions.

Exposure to tobacco smoking has been associated with diminished intelligence and attentional problems. One study indicated that children whose mothers had smoked 10 or more cigarettes a day were between 3 and 5 months behind schoolmates in reading, maths and general ability. However, other studies have found no direct link between IQ and tobacco smoking with maternal intelligence accounting entirely for the relationship.

=== Perinatal factors ===
There is also evidence that birth complications and other factors around the time of birth (perinatal) can have serious implications on intellectual development. For example, a prolonged period of time without access to oxygen during the delivery can lead to brain damage and intellectual disability. Also, low birth weights have been linked to lower intelligence scores later in lives of the children. There are two reasons for low birth weight, either premature delivery or the infant's size is just lower than average for its gestational age; both contribute to intellectual deficits later in life. A meta analysis of low birth weight babies found that there is a significant relationship between low birth weight and impaired cognitive abilities; however, the relationship is small, and they concluded that, although it may not be relevant at an individual level, it may instead be relevant at a population level. Other studies have also found that the correlations are relatively small unless the weight is extremely low (less than 1,500 g) – in which case the effects on intellectual development are more severe and often result in intellectual disability.

== Genetic influences ==
A 2009 review article identified over 50 genetic polymorphisms that have been reported to be associated with cognitive ability in various studies, but noted that the discovery of small effect sizes and lack of replication have characterized this research so far. Another study attempted to replicate 12 reported associations between specific genetic variants and general cognitive ability in three large datasets, but found that only one of the genotypes was significantly associated with general intelligence in one of the samples, a result expected by chance alone. The authors concluded that most reported genetic associations with general intelligence are probably false positives brought about by inadequate sample sizes. Arguing that common genetic variants explain much of the variation in general intelligence, they suggested that the effects of individual variants are so small that very large samples are required to reliably detect them. Genetic diversity within individuals is heavily correlated with IQ.

== Development of genius ==
It has been hypothesized that the development of genius in an area results from early environmental exposure to the topic in which the "genius" has prodigious knowledge or skill. This is utilizing the definition of genius that is not just a significantly higher than average IQ score, but also having some type of exceptional understanding or ability in a specific field. Albert Einstein is often used as an example of genius; he did not demonstrate generalized exceptional intelligence as a child; however, there is evidence that he started exploring the ideas of physics and the universe at a young age.

This fits with the model of development of fluid intelligence before age of maturity because the neuronal connections are still being made in childhood. The idea is if you expose a child to concepts of, for example theoretical physics, before their brain stops responding to the environment in a plastic way, then you get exceptional understanding of that field in adulthood, because there was a framework developed for it in early childhood. However, Garlick proposes that early environmental experience with their field of genius, is necessary but not sufficient to the development of genius.

Intelligence alone is not enough for the development of genius but the pathways and neural connections for divergent thinking are also necessary. Thus the home must encourage creativity. The parents of gifted children tend to supply enriching environments with intellectually and culturally stimulating materials thus increasing the child's likelihood to engage in creative activities.

There are many environmental influences on intelligence, typically divided into biological and non-biological factors, often involving social or cultural factors. The commonality between these two divisions is the exposure in early childhood. It seems as though exposure to these various positive or negative influences on intelligence levels needs to happen early on in the development of the brain, before the neuronal connections have ceased forming.

Parents of gifted children also tend to have above average educational achievement and at least one tends to work in an intellectual profession. There is also evidence that the probability of a gifted child becoming a genius may be increased if the child has had to face adversity or trauma and that a traditional upbringing may encourage conformity and discourage the necessary divergent thinking.

== Training ==
Training at an early age reduces synaptic pruning, which helps save neurons.

=== Musical ===
Early musical training in children is said to improve IQ. Schellenberg conducted a study in which children either received music lessons, drama lessons or no lessons and measured their intelligence scores. He found that children in the music group showed a greater overall increase in IQ scores than the children in the other groups. However, a study claimed that musical training improves verbal, but not visual memory. Significant differences in brain structure between musicians and non-musicians have been found. It was shown that there were significant differences in gray matter volume in motor, auditory and visual-spatial regions of the brain. The authors suggest that this could in part be because musicians from a young age translate visually perceived musical notes into motor commands whilst listening to the auditory output.

=== Chess ===
Studies have shown that chess requires auditory-verbal-sequential skills, not visuospatial skills. A German study found that Garry Kasparov, a Soviet / Russian former World Chess Champion, regarded by many as the greatest chess player of all time, has an IQ of 135 and an extremely good memory. Similarly, a study looking at young Belgian chess experts found that they have an average IQ of 121, a verbal IQ of 109 and a performance IQ of 129. However, a recent study looking at an elite group of young chess players found that intelligence was not a significant factor in chess skill.

One study found that students who were taking a chess class improved mathematical and comprehension performance. Despite this a recent study found that chess did not improve students' academic or cognitive abilities. At-risk students were put into 2 groups: one group was given a chess class once a week for 90 minutes, the other group was not. The results indicated no differences between the groups in changes in math, reading, writing or general intelligence.

== See also ==
- Compensatory education
- Flynn effect
- Nature versus nurture
- Outline of human intelligence
