= William Dickens =

American economist

William Theodore Dickens
- Born: December 31, 1953 (age 72)

Academic background
- Education: Bard College (B.A., 1976), Massachusetts Institute of Technology (Ph.D., 1981)

Academic work
- Discipline: Labor economics
- Institutions: Northeastern University

William Theodore Dickens (born December 31, 1953) is an American economist. He is a University Distinguished Professor of Economics and Social Policy at Northeastern University.

== Career ==
Dickens was on the faculty of the University of California, Berkeley from 1980 until 1995. While on leave he served as a senior economist with the President of the United States' Council of Economic Advisers, in 1993-94 where he worked for Laura Tyson. He was a Faculty Research Fellow and then a Research Associate with the National Bureau of Economic Research from 1982 to 1998. He was a senior fellow in Economic Studies at the Brookings Institution from 1995 to 2007, where he was a visiting fellow from 1994 to 1995 and a non resident senior fellow from 2007 to 2016. In 2007, he became Thomas C. Schelling Visiting professor at the University of Maryland, a position he held until joining Northeastern in June 2008. He subsequently served as a Russell Sage Foundation Visiting Scholar for one year. He was chair of the Department of Economics at Northeastern from 2013 to 2018.

== Research ==
Dickens' research interests include unemployment, race and intelligence, and changes in IQ over time (the Flynn effect). For example, he co-authored a 2006 study with James Flynn showing that the black-white IQ gap in the United States had decreased in size by at least 25% between 1972 and 2002. He and Flynn had previously proposed a hypothesis for why IQ appears to be both highly heritable and significantly affected by the environment. Their hypothesis argued that individual's IQs are significantly affected by both genes and environment, but that people's environments change in response to their IQs. Dickens has also worked with Nobel prize winner George Akerlof. Together they authored the 1982 paper "The Economic Consequences of Cognitive Dissonance". Scholars have described the Akerlof–Dickens model of cognitive dissonance as an influential early template for integrating psychological mechanisms into formal economic theory. Akerlof and Dickens also wrote two papers on inflation and unemployment in which they argued that psychological considerations lead to a long-run Phillips curve where there is a trade-off between inflation and unemployment.
