= Conor Dolan =

New Zealand psychologist

- Born: 5 April 1962 (age 64); Blenheim, New Zealand
- Education: University of Amsterdam (Ph.D., 1992)
- Scientific career
- Fields: Psychology
- Thesis: Biometric decomposition of phenotypic Means in human samples (1992)
- Doctoral advisor: Louis Oppenheimer
- Doctoral students: Jelte Wicherts

Conor Vivian Dolan (born 5 April 1962 in Blenheim, New Zealand, also sometimes known as C.V. Dolan) is a New Zealand psychologist and professor in the Faculty of Behavioural and Movement Sciences at Vrije Universiteit Amsterdam.
