= Washington Summit Publishers =

American white nationalist book publisher

- Status: Active
- Founded: 2006
- Country of origin: United States
- Headquarters location: Augusta, Georgia
- Distribution: International
- Nonfiction topics: Racialism, eugenics, nationalism
- Official website: washsummit.com at the Wayback Machine (archived 31 March 2022))

Washington Summit Publishers (WSP) is a white nationalist publisher based in Augusta, Georgia, which produces and sells books on race and intelligence and related topics. The company is run by white supremacist Richard B. Spencer, who also ran the defunct white supremacist National Policy Institute.

== History ==
Before Spencer, the company was run by Louis Andrews. He was also director of the National Policy Institute and managing editor of The Occidental Quarterly, both heavily funded by William Regnery II.

In 2013, the company was listed as being headquartered in Whitefish, Montana. As of 2019, the company had moved to Augusta, Georgia.

== Authors ==
Authors published by WSP include Alain de Benoist, J. Philippe Rushton, Kevin B. MacDonald, Richard Lynn, Tatu Vanhanen, and Michael H. Hart.

== Journal ==
WSP published Radix Journal through its imprint Radix. Contributors have included Kerry Bolton, Peter Brimelow, Samuel T. Francis, Kevin B. MacDonald, William Regnery II, Alex Kurtagić, and Jared Taylor. The last article on RadixJournal.com was published in April 2021 and its last podcast episode was released in September of the same year; the website was taken offline in June 2023. Spencer started publishing a Substack under the name Radix Journal in April 2022, it later was rebranded as ALEXANDRIA.

== Subjects ==
This company has published content supportive of white nationalism and white supremacy. "Human biodiversity" (HBD), an alt-right euphemism for scientific racism, was one of the main publishing subjects of Washington Summit Publishers. The Southern Poverty Law Center (SPLC) said in 2006 that the company had reprinted racist tracts along with books promoting antisemitism and eugenics. In 2015, the SPLC listed Washington Summit Publishers as a white nationalist hate group.

== See also ==
- Institute for the Study of Man
