= Human Genetics Alert =

Watchdog group based in London, England

- Abbreviation: HGA
- Formation: 1999
- Founder: David King
- Founded at: London, England
- Type: Watchdog group
- Fields: Human genetics
- Director: David King
- Website: hgalert.org
- Formerly called: Campaign Against Human Genetic Engineering

Human Genetics Alert (abbreviated HGA) is a secular, independent watchdog group based in London, England. It advocates against uses of reproductive technology and human genetics research that it considers harmful.

== History ==
Human Genetics Alert was founded in 1999 as the Campaign Against Human Genetic Engineering. It was reborn as Human Genetics Alert (HGA) in December 2000, at which point it began to receive funding from the Joseph Rowntree Charitable Trust. HGA stopped receiving funding from the Joseph Rowntree Charitable Trust in 2005. As of December 2018, its director was David King.

== Positions ==
Human Genetics Alert states that it is not opposed to all genetic research, but that it is opposed to certain proposed uses of it, including human genetic engineering, human cloning, and genetic discrimination. The organisation has also opposed prenatal sex selection, and the proposal that led to the establishment of the UK Biobank.
