= Tatu Vanhanen =

Finnish political scientist and sociologist (1929–2015)

- Born: 17 April 1929; Vuoksenranta, Finland (now Ozyorskoye, Leningrad Oblast, Russia)
- Died: 22 August 2015 (aged 86); Nurmijärvi, Finland
- Education: University of Tampere
- Known for: Index of Democratization, race and intelligence
- Spouse: Anni Tiihonen
- Children: Matti Vanhanen
- Scientific career
- Fields: Political science Sociology

Tatu Vanhanen (17 April 1929 – 22 August 2015) was a Finnish political scientist and sociologist. He was a professor of political science at the University of Tampere in Tampere, Finland. His late research on IQ, ethnocentrism and their connection to the economy was highly controversial.

Vanhanen was a coauthor with Richard Lynn of IQ and the Wealth of Nations (2002) and IQ and Global Inequality (2006), and author of Ethnic Conflicts Explained by Ethnic Nepotism (1999). In these controversial publications, the authors argue that differences in national income (in the form of per capita gross domestic product) are correlated with differences in the average national intelligence quotient (IQ). The 2006 follow-up study, later described by ScienceDaily as 'deeply flawed', claimed to show 'Africans' have an average IQ of 69, compared to a mean of 100 for "Western Europeans".

The books have drawn widespread criticism from other academics. Critiques have included questioning of the methodology used, the incompleteness of the data, and the conclusions drawn from the analysis.

== Work ==
Vanhanen's Index of Democracy

Vanhanen developed an interest in evolutionary biology after studying E. O. Wilson's sociobiology and later in his career wrote about intelligence and inequality. He supported applying evolutionary and genetic methods to social sciences. However, most of his academic work dealt with democratization, which he had studied with international comparative methods. Vanhanen was known for his Index of Democratization.

In 2004, the Ombudsman of Minorities, Mikko Puumalainen, asked the police to start an investigation regarding Vanhanen's interview with a Helsingin Sanomat magazine Kuukausiliite, in which he stated that "Whereas the average IQ of Finns is 97, in Africa it is between 60 and 70. Differences in intelligence are the most significant factor in explaining poverty". The Finnish National Bureau of Investigations was considering launching a preliminary investigation on Vanhanen's speech but later decided against it, not finding that he had incited hatred against an ethnic group or committed any other crime.

== Personal life ==
Tatu Vanhanen was married to Anni Tiihonen and had three sons. One of them, Matti Vanhanen, was the Prime Minister of Finland from 2003 to 2010.

Vanhanen died on 22 August 2015 after a long period of illness, aged 86.

== Bibliography in English ==
=== Books ===
- Vanhanen, Tatu (1975). Political and social structures: American countries, 1850-1973. Tampere, Finland: Tampere University Press. ISBN 9789514403019.
- Vanhanen, Tatu (1976). Political and social structures: Part 2: European countries 1850-1974. Tampere, Finland: Tampere University Press. ISBN 9780835702539.
- Vanhanen, Tatu (1978). Multi-party democracy in action. Tampere, Finland: Tampere University Press. ISBN 9789514406935.
- Vanhanen, Tatu (1979). Power and the means of power: a study of 119 Asian, European, American, and African states, 1850-1975. University Microfilms International. ISBN 9780835703987.
- Vanhanen, Tatu (1990). The process of democratization: A comparative study of 147 states 1980–1988. Crane Russak. ISBN 9780844816401.
- Vanhanen, Tatu (1991). Politics of ethnic nepotism: India as an example. Sterling Publishing. ISBN 9788120711761.
- Vanhanen, Tatu (1992). Strategies of democratization. Taylor & Francis. ISBN 9780844817200.
- Vanhanen, Tatu (1992). On the evolutionary roots of politics. Sterling Publishing. ISBN 9788120714212.
- Vanhanen, Tatu; Pridham, Geoffrey (1994). Democratization in Eastern Europe: Domestic and international perspectives. Routledge. ISBN 9780415110648.
- Vanhanen, Tatu (1997). Prospects of democracy: A study of 172 countries. Routledge. ISBN 9780415144063.
- Vanhanen, Tatu (1999). Ethnic conflicts explained by ethnic nepotism. Research in Biopolitics. Emerald Group Publishing. ISBN 9780762305834.
- Vanhanen, Tatu; Lynn, Richard (2002). IQ and the wealth of nations. Westport, Connecticut: Praeger. ISBN 9780275975104.
- Vanhanen, Tatu (2003). Democratization: A comparative analysis of 170 countries. Routledge. ISBN 9780415318600.
- Vanhanen, Tatu (2009). The limits of democratization: Climate, intelligence, and resource distribution. Washington: Washington Summit Publishers. ISBN 9781593680312.
- Vanhanen, Tatu; Lynn, Richard (2012). Intelligence: A unifying construct for the social sciences. Ulster: Ulster Institute for Social Research. ISBN 9780956881175.
- Vanhanen, Tatu (2014). Global inequality as a consequence of human diversity: A new theory tested by empirical evidence. Ulster: Ulster Institute for Social Research. ISBN 9780957391376.

== See also ==
- Race and intelligence
