= Earl B. Hunt =

American psychologist (1933–2016)

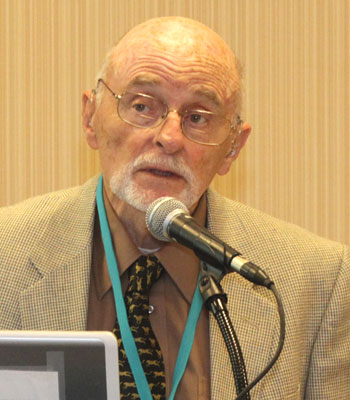
- Receiving Lifetime achievement award at ISIR in 2009
- Born: January 8, 1933; San Francisco, California, U.S.
- Died: April 13, 2016 (aged 83); Seattle, Washington, U.S.
- Other name: Buz Hunt
- Education: Stanford University; Yale University
- Known for: Research on intelligence
- Awards: James McKeen Cattell Fellow Award,
- Scientific career
- Fields: Psychology
- Workplaces: UCLA; University of Washington
- Doctoral advisor: Carl Hovland

Earl Busby "Buz" Hunt (January 8, 1933 – April 12 or 13, 2016) was an American psychologist specializing in the study of human and artificial intelligence. Within these fields he focused on individual differences in intelligence and the implications of these differences within a high-technology society. He was in partial retirement as emeritus professor of psychology and adjunct professor of computer science at the University of Washington at the time of his death. His book Will We Be Smart Enough? discussed demographic projections and psychometric research as they relate to predictions of possible future workplaces.

== Education and career ==
Hunt spent a year studying at Cornell University before transferring to Stanford University, where he studied psychology and enrolled in Reserve Officers' Training Corps. He spent three years in the United States Marine Corps and received honorable discharge in 1957. He received his PhD in psychology and computer science under the supervision of Carl Hovland from Yale University in 1960. He held faculty position at Yale University, University of California, Los Angeles and University of Sydney. In 1966, he moved to the University of Washington, where he remained a professor in psychology and computer science for the rest of his career. From 1971 to 1978, Hunt was the chair of the psychology department at the University of Washington. In 2001, he became professor emeritus.

Hunt was president of the International Society for Intelligence Research in 2011.

== Publications ==
=== Books ===
- Hunt, Earl (2011). Human intelligence. Cambridge New York: Cambridge University Press. ISBN 978-0-521-70781-7.
- Hunt, Earl (2007). The mathematics of behavior. Cambridge New York: Cambridge University Press. ISBN 978-0-521-61522-8.
- Hunt, Earl (2002). Thoughts on Thought. Mahwah, N.J: L. Erlbaum Associates. ISBN 978-0-8058-0265-8.
- Hunt, Earl (1995). Will we be smart enough? : a cognitive analysis of the coming workforce. New York: Russell Sage Foundation. ISBN 0-87154-392-3.
- Hunt, Earl (1975). Artificial intelligence. New York: Academic Press. ISBN 978-0-12-362340-9.
- Earl B. Hunt; Janet Marin; Philip J. Stone (1966). Experiments in Induction. New York: Academic Press. ISBN 978-0-12-362350-8.
- Hunt, Earl (1962). Concept learning: An information processing problem. Hoboken New Jersey: John Wiley & Sons. doi:10.1037/13135-000. hdl:2027/ien.35556023389612. ISBN 9780882751528.

=== Magazine articles ===
- Hunt, Earl (1995). "The Role of Intelligence in Modern Society". American Scientist. 83 (4). Sigma Xi, The Scientific Research Society: 356–368. Bibcode:1995AmSci..83..356H. JSTOR 29775483.
