= Genius =

Exceptional intellectual ability, creativity, or originality

Genius is a characteristic of original and exceptional insight in the performance of some art or endeavor that surpasses expectations, sets new standards for the future, establishes better methods of operation, or remains outside the capabilities of competitors. Genius is associated with intellectual ability and creative productivity. The term genius can also be used to refer to people characterised by genius, and/or to polymaths who excel across many subjects. There is no scientifically precise definition of genius. Howard Gardener identified at least eight distinct categories of intelligences that are generalized within the noun 'Genius'. Those categories include linguistic, logical-mathematical, spatial, musical, bodily-kinesthetic, interpersonal, intrapersonal, and naturalistic intelligence. However, other researchers have seen no evidence supporting his proposal for independent brain-based intelligences for different types of cognitive abilities. Experts like Visser argue that the multiple intelligences (MI) hypothesis is wrong and that the general intelligence factor (g) is observable in non-verbal, non-quantitative, and non-paper-and-pencil tasks regardless of whether tasks are timed or untimed. When used to refer to the characteristic, genius is associated with talent, but several authors such as Cesare Lombroso and Arthur Schopenhauer systematically distinguish these terms. Walter Isaacson, biographer of many well-known geniuses, explains that although high intelligence may be a prerequisite, the most common trait that actually defines a genius may be the extraordinary ability to apply creativity and imaginative thinking to almost any situation.

In the early-19th century Carl von Clausewitz, who had a particular interest in what he called "military genius", defined "the essence of Genius" (German: der Genius) in terms of "a very high mental capacity for certain employments".

== Etymology ==
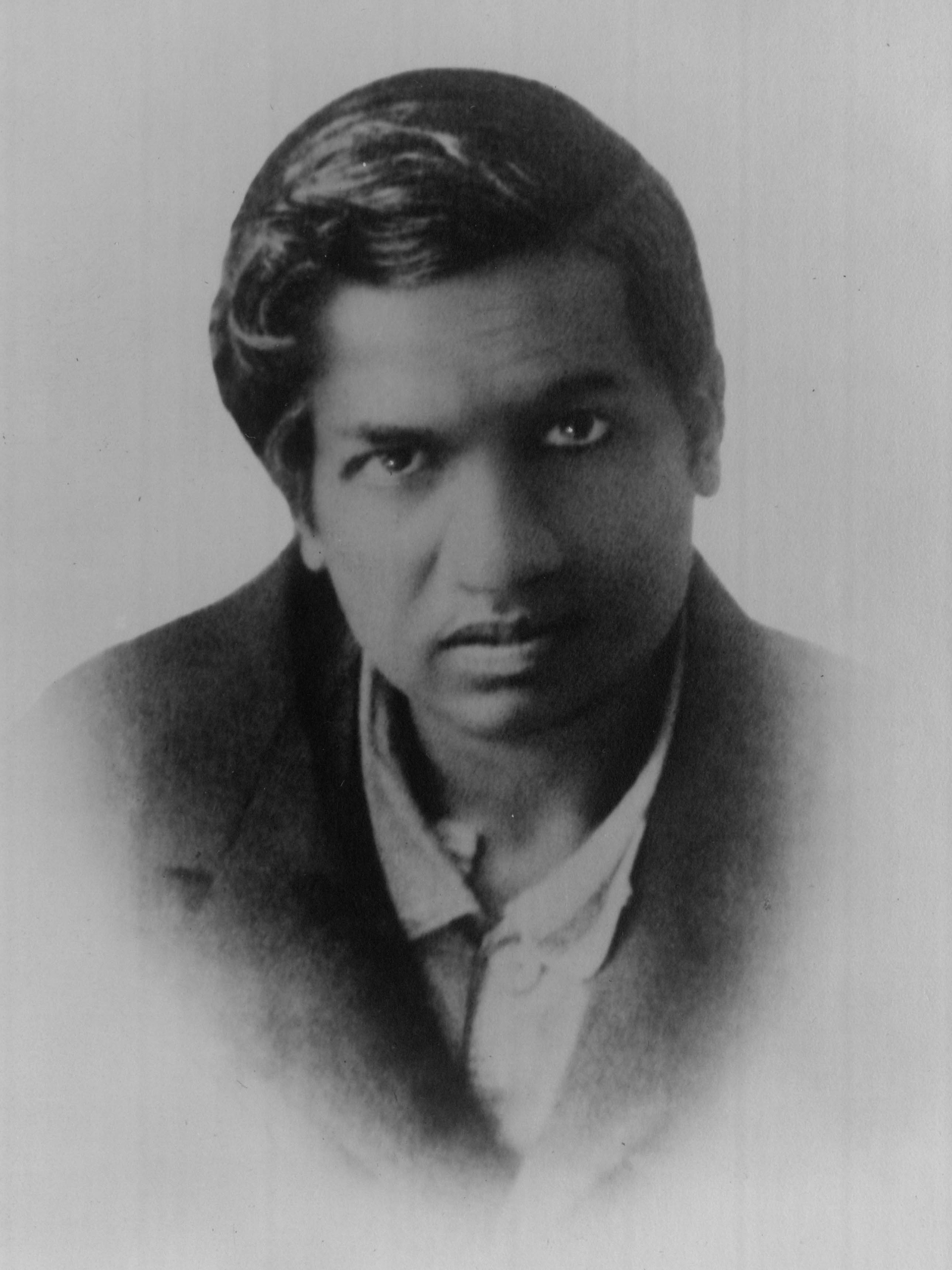
Srinivasa Ramanujan, a mathematician who is widely regarded as a genius. He made substantial contributions to mathematics despite little formal training.

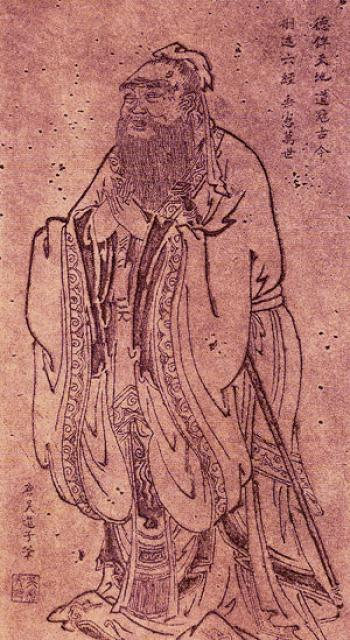
Confucius, one of the most influential thinkers of the ancient world and the most famous Chinese philosopher, is often considered a genius.

In ancient Rome, the genius (plural in Latin genii) was the guiding spirit or tutelary deity of a person, family (gens), or place (genius loci). Connotations of the word in Latin have a lineal relationship with the Greek word daemon in classical and medieval texts, and also share a relationship with the Arabic word al-ghul (as in the star Algol; its literal meaning being "the Demon").

The noun is related to the Latin verbs "gignere" (to beget, to give birth to) and "generare" (to beget, to generate, to procreate), and derives directly from the Indo-European stem thereof: "ǵenh" (to produce, to beget, to give birth). Because the achievements of exceptional individuals seemed to indicate the presence of a particularly powerful genius, by the time of Augustus, the word began to acquire its secondary meaning of "inspiration, talent". The term genius acquired its modern sense in the eighteenth century, and is a conflation of two Latin terms: genius, as above, and Ingenium, a related noun referring to our innate dispositions, talents, and inborn nature. Beginning to blend the concepts of the divine and the talented, the Encyclopédie article on genius (génie) describes such a person as "he whose soul is more expansive and struck by the feelings of all others; interested by all that is in nature never to receive an idea unless it evokes a feeling; everything excites him and on which nothing is lost."

== Historical development ==
=== Galton ===
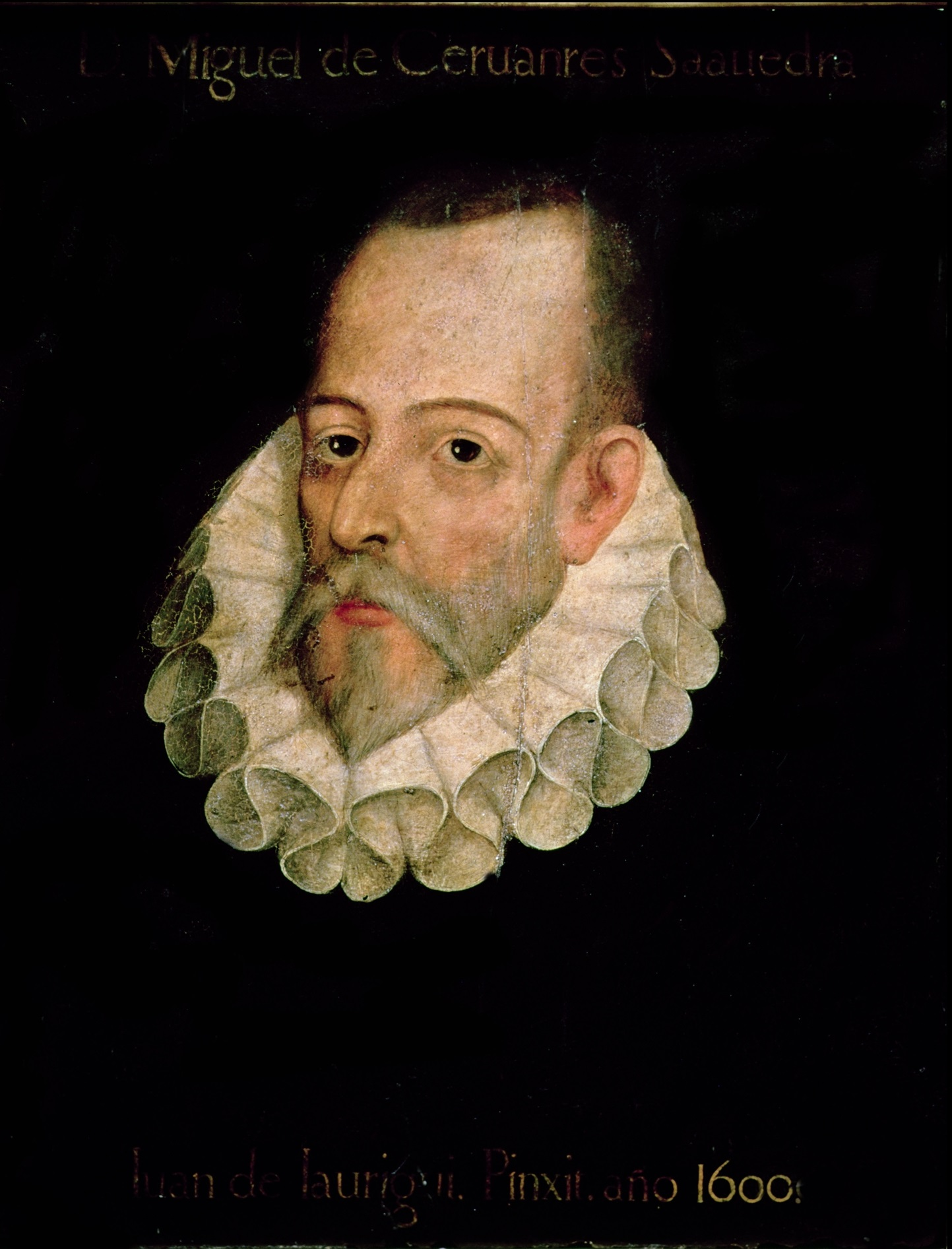
Miguel de Cervantes, novelist who is acknowledged as a literary genius

The assessment of intelligence was initiated by Francis Galton (1822–1911) and James McKeen Cattell. They had advocated the analysis of reaction time and sensory acuity as measures of "neurophysiological efficiency" and the analysis of sensory acuity as a measure of intelligence.

Galton is regarded as the founder of psychometry. He studied the work of his older half-cousin Charles Darwin about biological evolution. Hypothesizing that eminence is inherited from ancestors, Galton did a study of families of eminent people in Britain, publishing it in 1869 as Hereditary Genius. Galton's ideas were elaborated from the work of two early 19th-century pioneers in statistics: Carl Friedrich Gauss and Adolphe Quetelet. Gauss discovered the normal distribution (bell-shaped curve): given a large number of measurements of the same variable under the same conditions, they vary at random from a most frequent value, the "average", to two least frequent values at maximum differences greater and lower than the most frequent value. Quetelet discovered that the bell-shaped curve applied to social statistics gathered by the French government in the course of its normal processes on large numbers of people passing through the courts and the military. His initial work in criminology led him to observe "the greater the number of individuals observed the more do peculiarities become effaced...". This ideal from which the peculiarities were effaced became "the average man".

Galton was inspired by Quetelet to define the average man as "an entire normal scheme"; that is, if one combines the normal curves of every measurable human characteristic, one will, in theory, perceive a syndrome straddled by "the average man" and flanked by persons that are different. In contrast to Quetelet, Galton's average man was not statistical but was theoretical only. There was no measure of general averageness, only a large number of very specific averages. Setting out to discover a general measure of the average, Galton looked at educational statistics and found bell-curves in test results of all sorts; initially in mathematics grades for the final honors examination and in entrance examination scores for Sandhurst.

Galton's method in Hereditary Genius was to count and assess the eminent relatives of eminent men. He found that the number of eminent relatives was greater with a closer degree of kinship. This work is considered the first example of historiometry, an analytical study of historical human progress. The work is controversial and has been criticized for several reasons. Galton then departed from Gauss in a way that became crucial to the history of the 20th century AD. The bell-shaped curve was not random, he concluded. The differences between the average and the upper end were due to a non-random factor, "natural ability", which he defined as "those qualities of intellect and disposition, which urge and qualify men to perform acts that lead to reputation…a nature which, when left to itself, will, urged by an inherent stimulus, climb the path that leads to eminence." The apparent randomness of the scores was due to the randomness of this natural ability in the population as a whole, in theory.

Criticisms include that Galton's study fails to account for the impact of social status and the associated availability of resources in the form of economic inheritance, meaning that inherited "eminence" or "genius" can be gained through the enriched environment provided by wealthy families. Galton went on to develop the field of eugenics. Galton attempted to control for economic inheritance by comparing the adopted nephews of popes, who would have the advantage of wealth without being as closely related to popes as sons are to their fathers, to the biological children of eminent individuals.

== Psychology ==
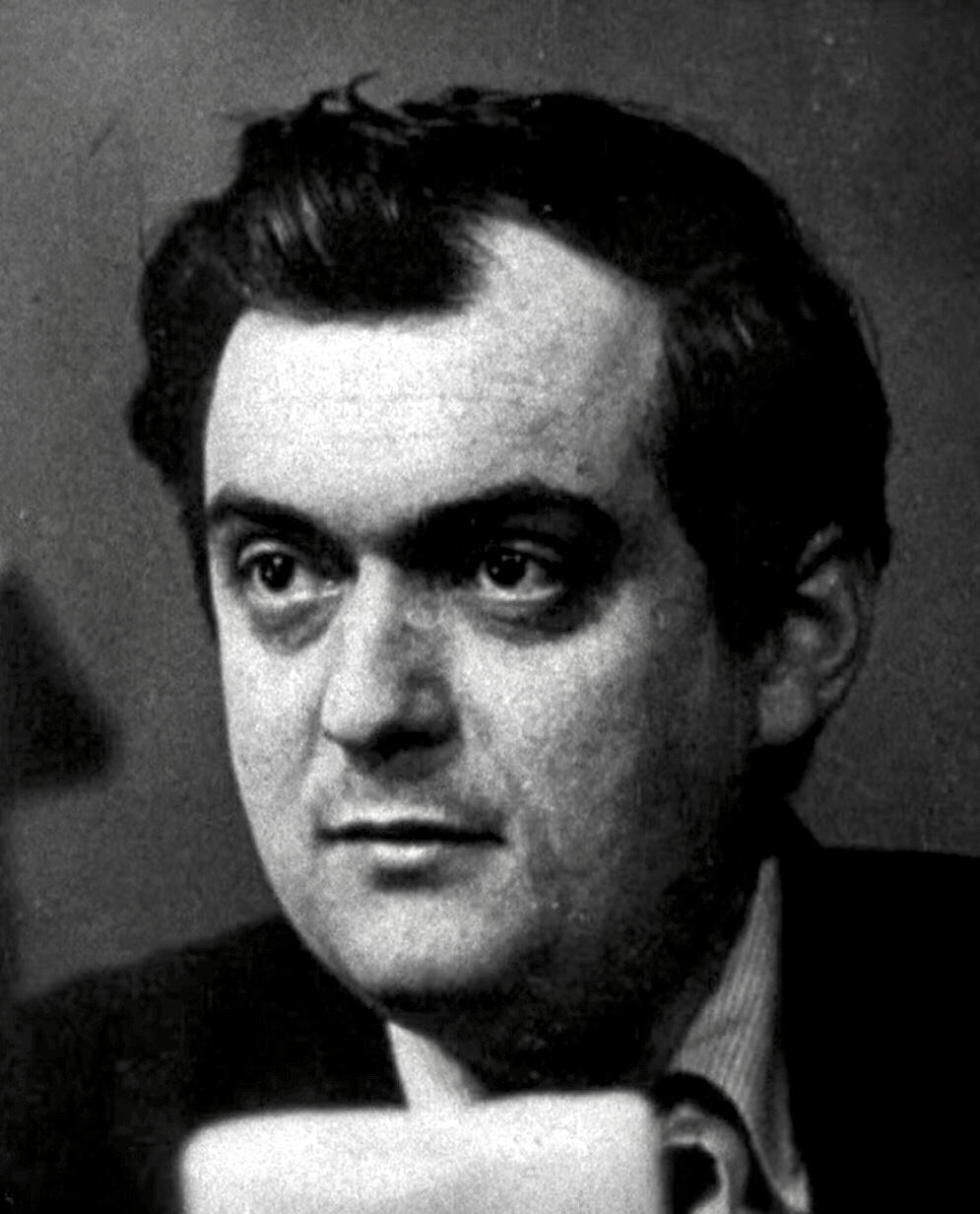
Stanley Kubrick, deemed a filmmaking genius

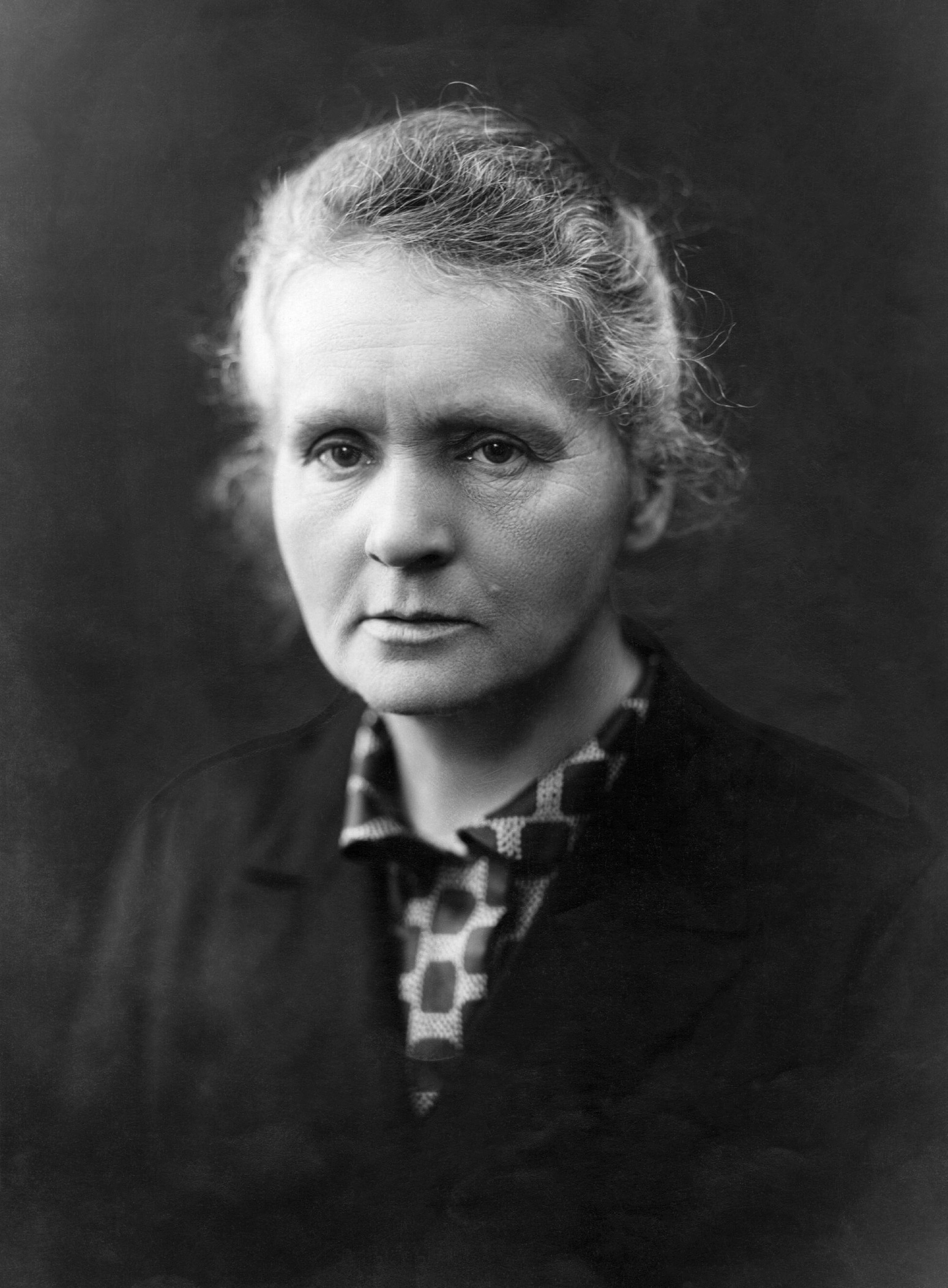
Marie "Skłodowska" Curie, physicist and chemist cited as a genius

Genius is expressed in a variety of forms (e.g., mathematical, literary, musical performance). Persons with genius tend to have strong intuitions about their domains, and they build on these insights with tremendous energy. Carl Rogers, a founder of the humanistic approach to psychology, expands on the idea of a genius trusting his or her intuition in a given field, writing: "El Greco, for example, must have realized as he looked at some of his early work, that 'good artists do not paint like that.' But somehow he trusted his own experiencing of life, the process of himself, sufficiently that he could go on expressing his own unique perceptions. It was as though he could say, 'Good artists don't paint like this, but I paint like this.' Or to move to another field, Ernest Hemingway was surely aware that 'good writers do not write like this.' But fortunately he moved toward being Hemingway, being himself, rather than toward someone else's conception of a good writer."

It has been suggested that there exists a connection between mental illness, in particular schizophrenia and bipolar disorder, and genius. Individuals with bipolar disorder and schizotypal personality disorder, the latter being more common amongst relatives of schizophrenics, tend to show elevated creativity. Several people who have been regarded as geniuses were diagnosed with mental disorders; examples include Vincent van Gogh, Virginia Woolf, John Forbes Nash Jr. and Ernest Hemingway.

In a 2010 study conducted by the Karolinska Institute, it was observed that highly creative individuals and schizophrenics have a lower density of thalamic dopamine D_{2} receptors. One of the investigators explained that "Fewer D_{2} receptors in the thalamus probably means a lower degree of signal filtering, and thus a higher flow of information from the thalamus." This could be a possible mechanism behind the ability of healthy highly creative people to see numerous uncommon connections in a problem-solving situation and the bizarre associations found in schizophrenics.

=== IQ and genius ===
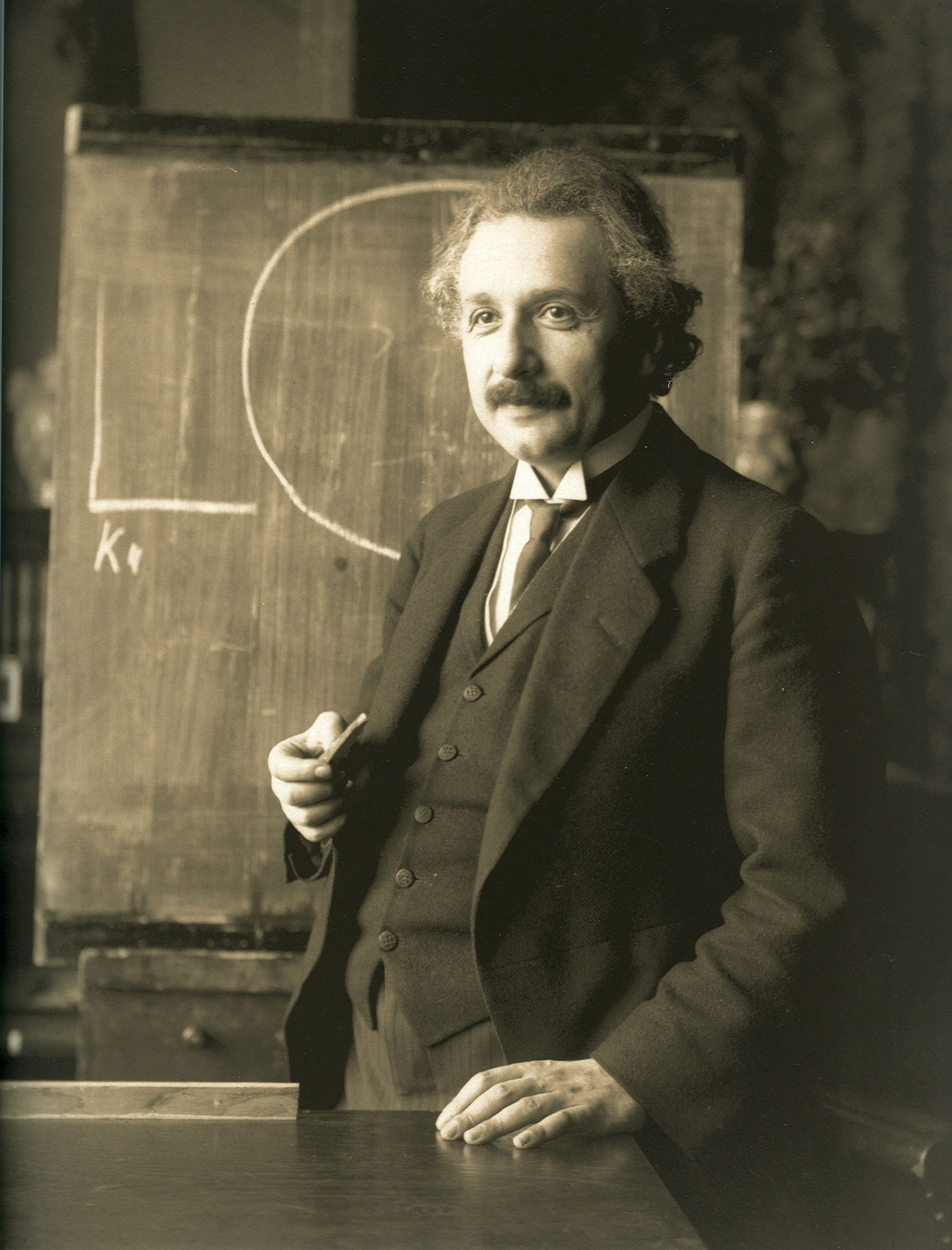
Albert Einstein, theoretical physicist who is considered a genius

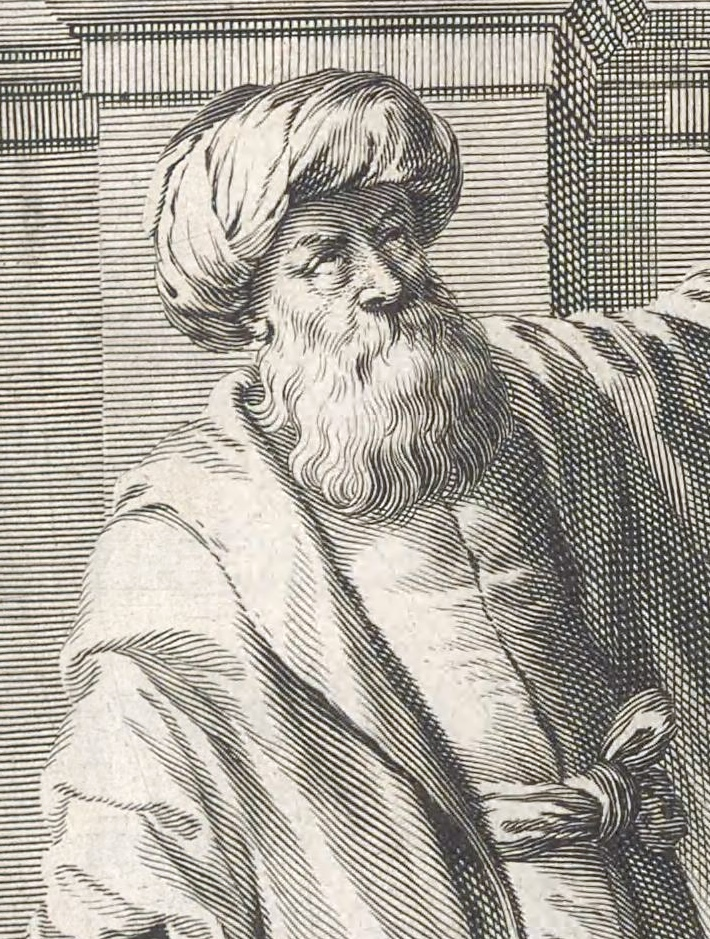
Ibn al-Haytham, a scientist and polymath who is considered a genius

Galton was a pioneer in investigating both eminent human achievement and mental testing. In his book Hereditary Genius, written before the development of IQ testing, he proposed that hereditary influences on eminent achievement are strong, and that eminence is rare in the general population. Lewis Terman chose "'near' genius or genius" as the classification label for the highest classification on his 1916 version of the Stanford–Binet test. By 1926, Terman began publishing about a longitudinal study of California schoolchildren who were referred for IQ testing by their schoolteachers, called Genetic Studies of Genius, which he conducted for the rest of his life. Catherine M. Cox, a colleague of Terman's, wrote a whole book, The Early Mental Traits of 300 Geniuses, published as volume 2 of The Genetic Studies of Genius book series, in which she analyzed biographical data about historic geniuses. Although her estimates of childhood IQ scores of historical figures who never took IQ tests have been criticized on methodological grounds, Cox's study was thorough in finding out what else matters besides IQ in becoming a genius. By the 1937 second revision of the Stanford–Binet test, Terman no longer used the term "genius" as an IQ classification, nor has any subsequent IQ test. In 1939, David Wechsler specifically commented that "we are rather hesitant about calling a person a genius on the basis of a single intelligence test score".

The Terman longitudinal study in California eventually provided historical evidence regarding how genius is related to IQ scores. Many California pupils were recommended for the study by schoolteachers. Two pupils who were tested but rejected for inclusion in the study (because their IQ scores were too low) grew up to be Nobel Prize winners in physics, William Shockley, and Luis Walter Alvarez. Based on the historical findings of the Terman study and on biographical examples such as Richard Feynman, who had a self-reported IQ of 125 and went on to win the Nobel Prize in physics and become widely known as a genius, the current view of psychologists and other scholars of genius is that a minimum level of IQ (approximately 125) is necessary for genius but not sufficient, and must be combined with personality characteristics such as drive and persistence, plus the necessary opportunities for talent development. For instance, in a chapter in an edited volume on achievement, IQ researcher Arthur Jensen proposed a multiplicative model of genius consisting of high ability, high productivity, and high creativity. Jensen's model was motivated by the finding that eminent achievement is highly positively skewed, a finding known as Price's law, and related to Lotka's law.

Some high IQ individuals join a High IQ society. The most famous and largest is Mensa International, but many other more selective organizations exist.

== Philosophy ==
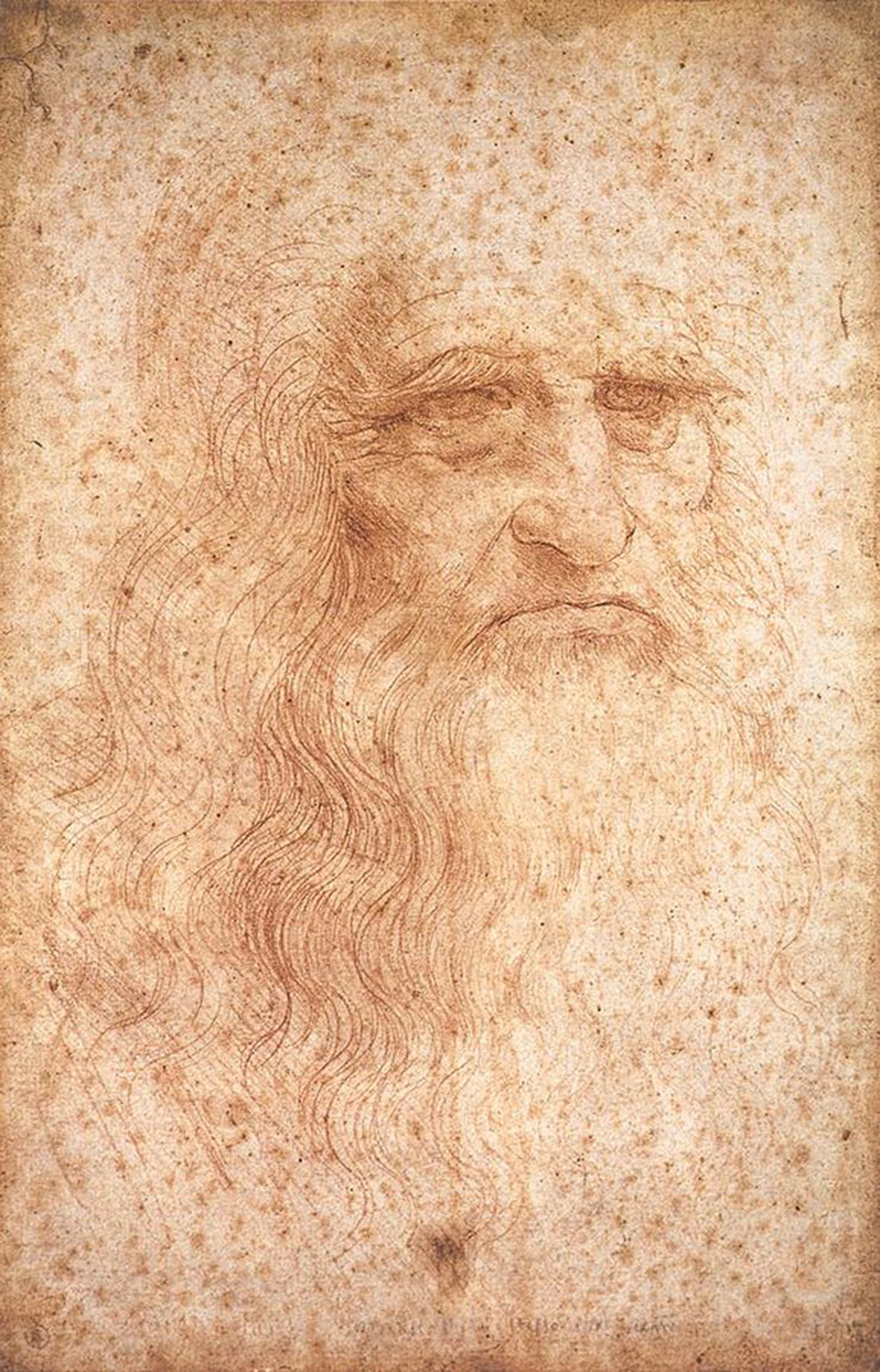
Leonardo da Vinci is widely acknowledged as having been a genius and a polymath.

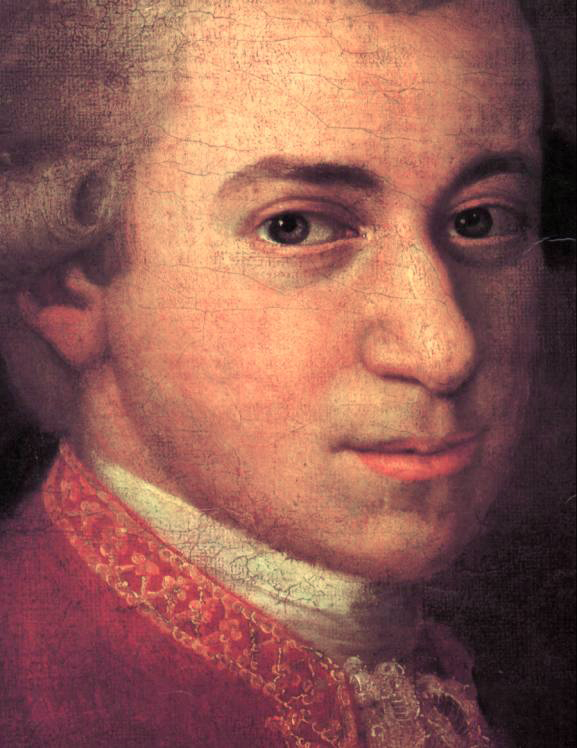
Wolfgang Amadeus Mozart, considered a prodigy and musical genius

Various philosophers have proposed definitions of what genius is and what that implies in the context of their philosophical theories.

In the philosophy of David Hume, the way society perceives genius is similar to the way society perceives the ignorant. Hume states that a person with the characteristics of a genius is looked at as a person disconnected from society, as well as a person who works remotely, at a distance, away from the rest of the world.

On the other hand, the mere ignorant is still more despised; nor is any thing deemed a surer sign of an illiberal genius in an age and nation where the sciences flourish, than to be entirely destitute of all relish for those noble entertainments. The most perfect character is supposed to lie between those extremes; retaining an equal ability and taste for books, company, and business; preserving in conversation that discernment and delicacy which arise from polite letters; and in business, that probity and accuracy which are the natural result of a just philosophy.

In the philosophy of Immanuel Kant, genius is the ability to independently arrive at and understand concepts that would normally have to be taught by another person. For Kant, originality was the essential character of genius. The artworks of the Kantian genius are also characterized by their exemplarity which is imitated by other artists and serve as a rule for other aesthetical judgements. This genius is a talent for producing ideas which can be described as non-imitative. Kant's discussion of the characteristics of genius is largely contained within the Critique of Judgment and was well received by the Romantics of the early 19th century. In addition, much of Schopenhauer's theory of genius, particularly regarding talent and freedom from constraint, is directly derived from paragraphs of Part I of Kant's Critique of Judgment.

Genius is a talent for producing something for which no determinate rule can be given, not a predisposition consisting of a skill for something that can be learned by following some rule or other.

In the philosophy of Arthur Schopenhauer, a genius is someone in whom intellect predominates over "will" much more than within the average person. In Schopenhauer's aesthetics, this predominance of the intellect over the will allows the genius to create artistic or academic works that are objects of pure, disinterested contemplation, the chief criterion of the aesthetic experience for Schopenhauer. Their remoteness from mundane concerns means that Schopenhauer's geniuses often display maladaptive traits in more mundane concerns; in Schopenhauer's words, they fall into the mire while gazing at the stars, an allusion to Plato's dialogue Theætetus, in which Socrates tells of Thales (the first philosopher) being ridiculed for falling in such circumstances. As he says in Volume 2 of The World as Will and Representation:

Talent hits a target no one else can hit; Genius hits a target no one else can see.

— Arthur Schopenhauer

In the philosophy of Thomas Carlyle, genius is called (in Past and Present) "the inspired gift of God"; the "Man of Genius" possesses "the presence of God Most High in a man". The actions of the "Man of Genius" can manifest this in various ways: in his "transcendent capacity of taking trouble" (often misquoted as "an infinite capacity for taking pains"), in that he can "recognise how every object has a divine beauty in it" as a poet or painter does, or in that he has "an original power of thinking". In accordance with his Great Man theory, Carlyle considered such individuals as Odin, William the Conqueror and Frederick the Great to be "Men of Genius".

In the philosophy of Bertrand Russell, genius entails that an individual possesses unique qualities and talents that make the genius especially valuable to the society in which he or she operates, once given the chance to contribute to society. Russell's philosophy further maintains, however, that it is possible for such geniuses to be crushed in their youth and lost forever when the environment around them is unsympathetic to their potential maladaptive traits. Russell rejected the notion he believed was popular during his lifetime that, "genius will out".

In his classic work The Limitations of Science, J. W. N. Sullivan discussed a utilitarian philosophy on the retrospective classification of genius. Namely, scholarship that is so original that, were it not for that particular contributor, would not have emerged until much later (if ever) is characteristic of genius. Conversely, scholarship that was ripe for development, no matter how profound or prominent, is not necessarily indicative of genius.

== The idea of the male genius ==
Even though figures like Marie Curie and Virginia Woolf are commonly considered to be geniuses, the idea of the genius is still largely associated with men. A US-based study published in Science in 2017 found out that, as early as six years old, young girls think brilliance as more of a male trait. This idea is also common among adults. In 2015, the non profit cultural and community center 92 street Y surveyed 2,043 people and found at that 87% of women and 93% of men think geniuses are men. This idea could come from the fact that the vast majority of scientific breakthroughs were made by men, and that the names that marked history for their brilliance were therefore men's names.

== Literature and pop culture ==
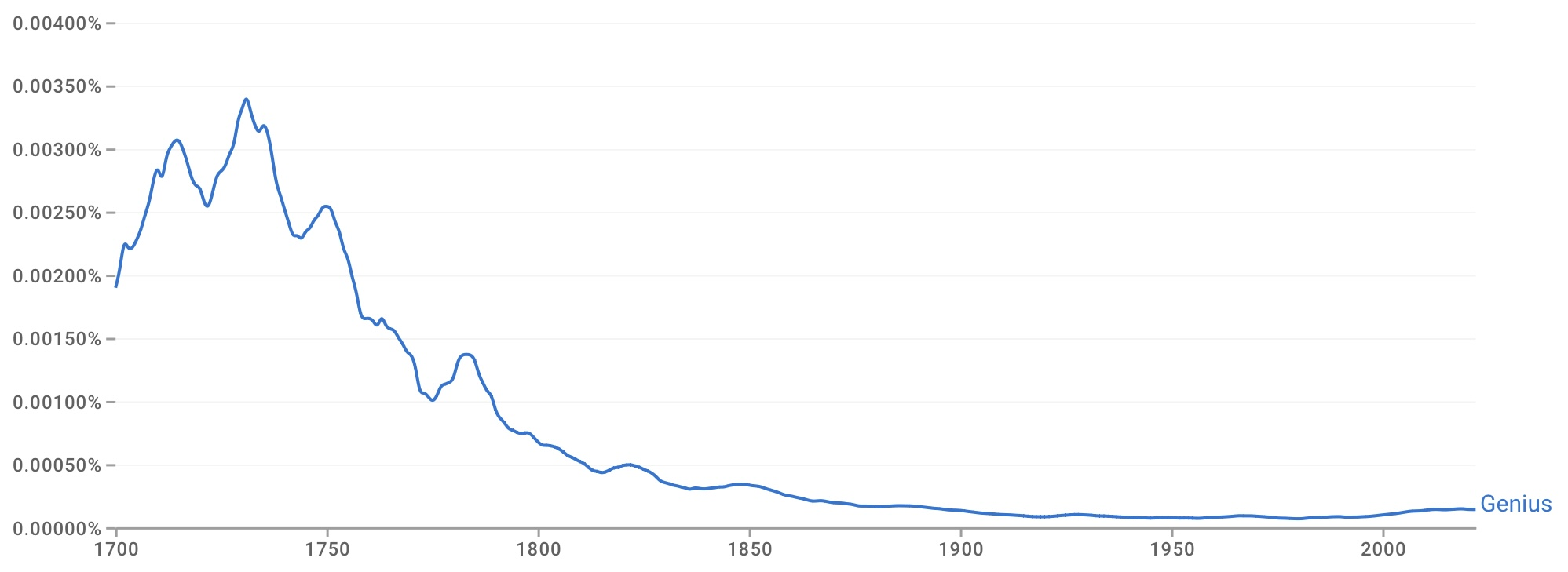
The Google Books Ngram Viewer indicating a marked decline in use of the word "genius" from 1700 to 2022

Geniuses are variously portrayed in literature and film as both protagonists and antagonists, and may be the hero or villain of the story. In pop culture, the genius is often stereotypically depicted as either the wisecracking whiz or the tortured genius.

Throughout both literature and movies, the tortured genius character is often seen as an imperfect or tragic hero who wrestles with the burden of superior intelligence, arrogance, eccentricities, addiction, awkwardness, mental health issues, a lack of social skills, isolation, or other insecurities. They regularly experience existential crises, struggling to overcome personal challenges to employ their special abilities for good or succumbing to their own tragic flaws and vices. This common motif repeated throughout fiction is notably present in the characters of Dr. Bruce Banner in the Hulk and Dr. Henry Jekyll in The Strange Case of Dr. Jekyll and Mr. Hyde, among others. Although not as extreme, other examples of literary and filmic characterizations of the tortured genius stereotype, to varying degrees, include: Wolfgang Amadeus Mozart in Amadeus, Dr. John Nash in A Beautiful Mind, Leonardo da Vinci in Da Vinci's Demons, Dr. Gregory House in House, Will Hunting in Good Will Hunting, and Dr. Sheldon Cooper in The Big Bang Theory, as well Stanford Pines in Gravity Falls.

One of the most famous genius-level rivalries to occur in literary fiction is between Sherlock Holmes and his nemesis Professor Moriarty; the latter character also identified as the modern archetype of an evil genius.

== See also ==
- Chess prodigy
- Intellectual giftedness
- Gifted education
- List of Nobel laureates
- MacArthur Fellows Program
- Savant syndrome

== Bibliography ==
- Cox, Catherine M. (1926). The Early Mental Traits of 300 Geniuses. Genetic Studies of Genius Volume 2. Stanford (CA): Stanford University Press. ISBN 0-8047-0010-9. LCCN 25008797. OCLC 248811346.
- Eysenck, Hans (1995). Genius: The Natural History of Creativity. Problems in the Behavioural Sciences No. 12. Cambridge: Cambridge University Press. ISBN 978-0-5-2148508-1.
- Eysenck, Hans (1998). Intelligence: A New Look. New Brunswick (NJ): Transaction Publishers. ISBN 978-0-7658-0707-6.
- Galton, Francis (1869). Hereditary Genius. London: MacMillan.
  - Robert H. Wozniak (1999). "Introduction to Hereditary Genius Francis Galton (1869)". Classics in the History of Psychology.
- Gleick, James (2011). Genius: The Life and Science of Richard Feynman (ebook ed.). Open Road Media. ISBN 978-1-4532-1043-7.
- Howe, Michael J. A. (1999). Genius Explained. Cambridge: Cambridge University Press. ISBN 978-0-521-00849-5.
- Jensen, Arthur R. (1998). The g Factor: The Science of Mental Ability. Human Evolution, Behavior, and Intelligence. Westport (CT): Praeger. ISBN 978-0-275-96103-9. ISSN 1063-2158.
  - Charles Locurto. "A Balance Sheet on Persistence: Book Review of Jensen on Intelligence-g-Factor". Psycoloquy.
- Kaufman, Alan S. (2009). IQ Testing 101. New York: Springer Publishing. pp. 151–153. ISBN 978-0-8261-0629-2.
- Leslie, Mitchell (July–August 2000). "The Vexing Legacy of Lewis Terman". Stanford Magazine. Archived from the original on 26 August 2021.
- Park, Gregory; Lubinski, David; Benbow, Camilla P. (2 November 2010). "Recognizing Spatial Intelligence". Scientific American.
- Pickover, Clifford A. (1998). Strange Brains and Genius: The Secret Lives of Eccentric Scientists and Madmen. Plenum Publishing Corporation. ISBN 978-0-688-16894-0.
- Pintner, Rudolph (1931). Intelligence Testing: Methods and Results. New York: Henry Holt.
- Robinson, Andrew (2011). Genius: A Very Short Introduction. Oxford: Oxford University Press. ISBN 978-0-19-959440-5.
  - GrrlScientist (3 March 2011). "Genius: A Very Short Introduction [Book Review]". The Guardian.
- Shurkin, Joel (1992). Terman's Kids: The Groundbreaking Study of How the Gifted Grow Up. Boston (MA): Little, Brown. ISBN 978-0-316-78890-8.
  - Frederic Golden (May 31, 1992). "Tracking the IQ Elite: TERMAN'S KIDS: The Groundbreaking Study of How the Gifted Grow Up, By Joel N. Shurkin". Los Angeles Times. Archived from the original on 2012-11-08.
- Shurkin, Joel (2006). Broken Genius: The Rise and Fall of William Shockley, Creator of the Electronic Age. London: Macmillan. ISBN 978-1-4039-8815-7.
  - Brian Clegg. "Review - Broken Genius - Joel Shurkin". Popular Science. Archived from the original on 2006-10-06.
- Simonton, Dean Keith (1999). Origins of genius: Darwinian perspectives on creativity. Oxford: Oxford University Press. ISBN 978-0-19-512879-6. JSTOR 3080746.
- Terman, Lewis M. (1916). The Measurement of Intelligence: An Explanation of and a Complete Guide to the Use of the Stanford Revision and Extension of the Binet-Simon Intelligence Scale. Riverside Textbooks in Education. Ellwood P. Cubberley (Editor's Introduction). Boston: Houghton Mifflin.
- Terman, Lewis M.; Merrill, Maude (1937). Measuring Intelligence: A Guide to the Administration of the New Revised Stanford–Binet Tests of Intelligence. Boston: Houghton Mifflin.
- Terman, Lewis Madison; Merrill, Maude A. (1960). Stanford–Binet Intelligence Scale: Manual for the Third Revision Form L–M with Revised IQ Tables by Samuel R. Pinneau. Boston (MA): Houghton Mifflin.
- Thys, Erik (2014). "Creativity and Psychopathology: A Systematic Review". Psychopathology. 47 (3): 141–147. doi:10.1159/000357822. PMID 24480798. S2CID 12879552.
- Wechsler, David (1939). The Measurement of Adult Intelligence (first ed.). Baltimore, MD: Williams & Witkins. ISBN 978-1-59147-606-1.
