= James Flynn (academic) =

New Zealand intelligence researcher (1934–2020)

James Flynn FRSNZ
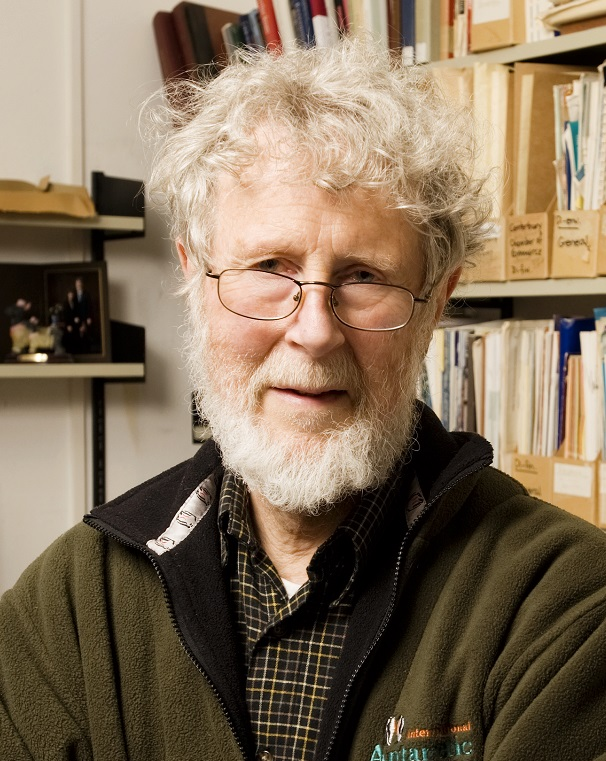
- Flynn in 2009
- Born: James Robert Flynn; 28 April 1934; Washington, D.C., U.S.
- Died: 11 December 2020 (aged 86); Dunedin, New Zealand
- Education: University of Chicago (BA, PhD)
- Known for: Flynn effect
- Children: Victor Flynn
- Scientific career
- Fields: Political science; Moral philosophy; Social science
- Workplaces: University of Wisconsin-Whitewater; University of Canterbury; University of Otago
- Thesis: Ethics and the Modern Social Scientist (1958)

James Robert Flynn (28 April 1934 – 11 December 2020) was an American-born New Zealand moral philosopher and intelligence researcher. Originally from Washington, D.C., and educated at the University of Chicago, Flynn emigrated to Dunedin in 1963, where he taught political studies at the University of Otago. He was noted for his publications about the continued year-after-year increase of IQ scores throughout the world, which is now referred to as the Flynn effect. In addition to his academic work, he championed social democratic politics throughout his life.

== Early life and education ==
James Robert Flynn was born in an Irish-American community in Washington, D.C., on April 28, 1934. His parents were Irish-Americans from Missouri. His father, Joseph, left formal schooling at age 12 to work in a factory and later became a "hard-drinking" journalist and editor. Flynn described his father as a "keen reader" who took pride in completing the New York Times crossword puzzle in pen rather than pencil. Flynn's father read classical works to him at a young age, and Flynn said he was "surrounded by good literature" as a child. Flynn became an avid reader as well; later in life, he wrote a book about world literature, and in a 2010 commencement address, he encouraged graduates to learn by reading "works of great literature". His mother, Mae, was an office worker and homemaker who trained as a teacher. He had a brother, Joseph, who became a non-isothermal kinetics chemist.

Raised Roman Catholic, Flynn was a choir boy at Washington, D.C.'s Cathedral of St. Matthew the Apostle and attended the Catholic private schools St. Paul's Primary School and St. John's Academy. Flynn renounced his Catholic religion at age 12 after winning a full set of World Book Encyclopedia in a city-wide competition and reading about scientific explanations for the creation of the universe that contradicted his creationist education. He credited his rejection of Catholicism and his parents' racial views for forming his secular, socialist views on racial and social equality. Flynn described himself as an "atheist, a scientific realist, a social democrat".

Flynn was a lifelong competitive runner who ran for his high school and college and earned six US running medals over the course of his life.

In the 1950s, Flynn earned a scholarship to the University of Chicago, where he originally intended to study pure mathematics or theoretical physics "because they seemed to pose the most difficult problems to solve", but ended up studying moral and political philosophy, a field with more practical applications. An "ardent democratic socialist" and "man of the left" throughout his life, Flynn joined the Socialist Party of America in college and, after graduating, became a civil rights activist. While working on his doctorate in politics and moral philosophy, he was political action co-chairman for the university branch of the NAACP, where he worked on its social housing initiatives. His doctorate dissertation was titled, "Ethics and the Modern Social Scientist."

He met his wife, an attorney whose family was active in the Communist Party USA, at a protest against segregation at Glen Echo Park in Maryland. He was 26 years old at the time, and she was 17. His wife said that Flynn "ticked the entire list of qualities I wanted in a husband and which I had written down in my diary at the age of 15": he was tall, smart, funny, held left-wing political views, could stand up to her mother, and had a job with a pension. She proposed to him three times: he declined the first two times due to her young age before accepting the third proposal. They named their eldest son, Oxford University maths professor Victor Flynn, after socialist Eugene Victor Debs. The couple also had a daughter, who became a clinical psychologist.

== Early career ==
After earning his doctorate in 1958 at age 24, Flynn taught at Eastern Kentucky University in Richmond, Kentucky, where he chaired the local chapter of the Congress of Racial Equality (CORE), a civil rights organisation in the US South. He was reprimanded by the mayor of Richmond and the university for his anti-segregation activism, and removed as the university's track coach. In 1961, he left Kentucky to teach at the University of Wisconsin-Whitewater, followed by Lake Forest College in Chicago, from which he was fired for giving a lecture on social medicine, working as a peace activist, and being a member of the Socialist Party.

By Flynn's own account, in early 1960s America he was consistently fired for his social democratic politics. Accordingly, in 1963, aged 29, he emigrated with his family to New Zealand, where he taught at the University of Canterbury in Christchurch and remained active (from afar) in the American civil rights movement. In New Zealand Flynn continued to campaign for left-wing causes, and advised Labour Prime Minister Norman Kirk on foreign policy. He was a member of the anti-war Committee on Vietnam and gave lectures against nuclear proliferation. In 1967, he joined the University of Otago in Dunedin as Foundation Professor of Political Studies and head of the university's politics department. In 1973, Flynn published Humanism and Ideology: An Aristotelian View.

== IQ research and the Flynn effect ==
External videos
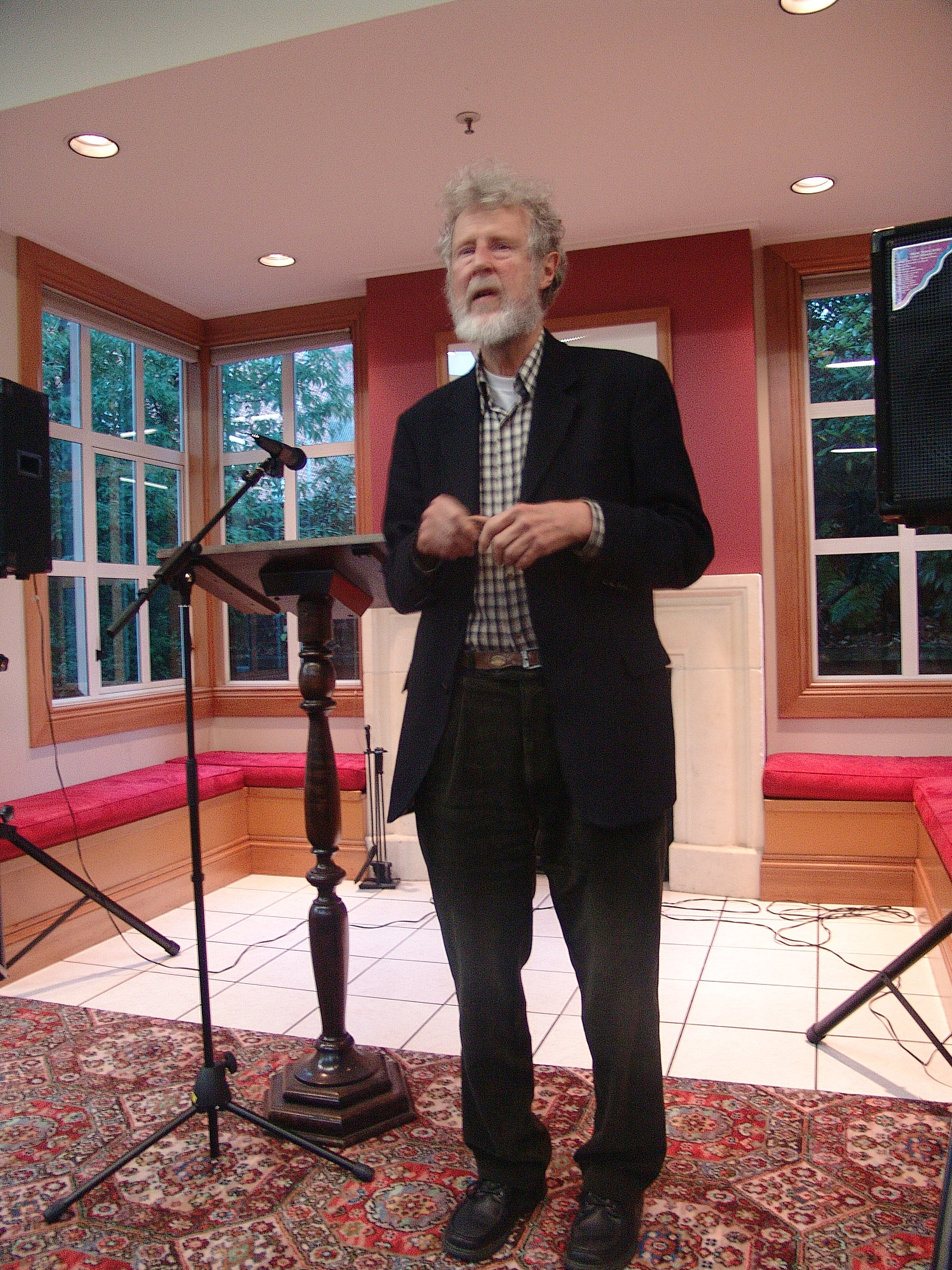
- James Flynn: Why our IQ levels are higher than our grandparents' on YouTube, TED talks

In 1978, while working on a refutation of classical racism for an upcoming book about "humane ideals", Flynn read University of California, Berkeley educational psychologist Arthur Jensen's 1969 article, "How Much Can We Boost IQ and Scholastic Achievement?", which argued that black people scored lower than white people on IQ tests because of genetic differences between the races.

Flynn initially planned to spend only a few pages on his book refuting Jensen's work. After studying historical IQ tests, Flynn noticed that although the IQ tests were always calibrated so that a score of "100" was average, the actual raw scores showed that people's performance on the IQ tests improved over time. Flynn calculated that the average American in the year 1900 would have scored a 67 on the version of IQ tests administered in the year 2000, a score that suggested mental impairment. Because such an increase in IQ scores over only a few generations could not have been caused by genetic evolution, Flynn concluded that the increases must have been caused by changes in environmental factors, meaning that IQ is influenced more by environment than by genetics.

In 1980, Flynn published his research critiquing Jensen's work in his seminal book, Race, IQ and Jensen, which argued that increases in IQ scores over time, and differences in scores between groups of people such as black people and white people, are caused by environmental rather than genetic factors.

In 1984, he published an article, "The Mean IQ of Americans: Massive Gains 1932 to 1978", examining Stanford-Binet and Wechsler IQ test results, and reported that Americans' average scores increased by 13.8 IQ points in 46 years, almost an entire standard deviation.

In response to critics suggesting that the IQ increase could be attributed in increases in education (as opposed to innate intelligence), Flynn examined the results of Raven's Progressive Matrices IQ tests, which use visual patterns rather than words to estimate fluid intelligence or "on-the-spot problem solving", irrespective of educational or cultural differences among test-takers. Such non-verbal tests can be used to compare diverse populations such as San people and Inuktun. In 1987, Flynn published "Massive IQ Gains in 14 Nations: What IQ Tests Really Measure", which found that IQ points in 14 countries, as measured by Raven tests, increased between five and 25 points. Test score increases have been continuous and approximately linear from the earliest years of testing to the present. For the Raven's Progressive Matrices test, subjects born over a 100-year period were compared in Des Moines, Iowa, and separately in Dumfries, Scotland. Improvements were remarkably consistent across the whole period, in both countries. This effect of an apparent increase in IQ has also been observed in various other parts of the world, though the rates of increase vary.

In 1994, Harvard University psychologist Richard Herrnstein and American Enterprise Institute political scientist Charles Murray published the highly-controversial book The Bell Curve: Intelligence and Class Structure in American Life, which discussed Flynn's research and dubbed the increase in IQ scores the "Flynn effect". Flynn often debated Jensen and Murray, but there was mutual admiration between them, and he defended them against accusations of racism.

Flynn believed in racial equality. He advocated open scientific debate about controversial social science claims, and was critical of the suppression of research into race and intelligence. He urged those who believe in racial equality to use solid evidence to advance those beliefs. Flynn did not believe genetic differences in intelligence between races existed; he argued that intelligence is influenced by environmental factors that correlate with socioeconomic status.

The "Flynn effect" is the substantial and long-sustained increase in intelligence test scores measured in many parts of the world. When intelligence quotient (IQ) tests are initially standardised using a sample of test-takers, by convention the average of the test results is set to 100 and their standard deviation is set to 15 IQ points. When IQ tests are revised they are again standardised using a new sample of test-takers, usually born more recently than the first. Again, the average result is set to 100. However, when the new test subjects take the older tests, in almost every case their average scores are significantly above 100.

Flynn gained international recognition for the Flynn effect, which has become widely accepted by psychologists and has been documented in large portions of the developed world and several developing countries, at rates too fast and dramatic to be caused by changes in genes, and correlating with environmental changes such as modernisation and improvements in education. Although Flynn was not the first to document increases in IQ or criticise IQ tests, international discussion and acceptance of the Flynn effect sparked a significant reassessment by researchers of IQ tests and the nature of human intelligence.

There are numerous proposed explanations of the Flynn effect, as well as some scepticism about its implications. Similar improvements have been reported for other cognitions such as semantic and episodic memory. Recent research suggests that the Flynn effect may have ended in at least a few developed nations, possibly allowing national differences in IQ scores to diminish if the Flynn effect continues in nations with lower average national IQs.

Flynn himself, with co-worker William Dickens, has suggested an explanatory model which points to two-way causality between IQ and environment: a cognitively challenging environment raises an individual's IQ, while in addition, a higher individual IQ makes it more likely that an individual will self-select or be sorted into more cognitively challenging environments.

== Later career ==
He was in favour of homosexual law reform in New Zealand and in 1985 listed his name openly in support.

While teaching at Otago in the 1990s, Flynn became a founding member of the NewLabour and Alliance political parties. He stood unsuccessfully as an Alliance candidate for the New Zealand House of Representatives in general elections in the Dunedin North electorate in 1993, 1996, and 2005 elections. In 2008 he acted as the Alliance spokesperson for finance and taxation.

In 1996, Flynn stepped down as head of the University of Otago's politics department and in 1997, he became Emeritus Professor in the Politics and Psychology departments.

In 1999, Flynn had surgery for intestinal cancer, which remained in remission for twenty years.

A 1999 article published in American Psychologist summarised much of his research up to that point. On the alleged genetic inferiority of Blacks on IQ tests, he lays out the argument and evidence for such a belief and then contests each point. He interprets the direct evidence—when Blacks are raised in settings that are less disadvantageous—as suggesting that environmental factors explain average group differences. And yet, he argues that the environmental explanation gained force after the discovery that IQ scores were rising over time. Inter-generational IQ differences among Whites and across nations were larger than the Black-White IQ Gap and could not be accounted for by genetic factors, which, if anything, should have reduced IQ, according to scholars he references. In that and in later works, he posited that the Black-White IQ score gap can be largely explained by environmental factors if "the average environment for Blacks in 1995 matches the quality of the average environment for Whites in 1945."

In 2000, Flynn published what he considered his most important book, How to Defend Humane Ideals, which he dedicated to his wife and which was a "recalibration" of the "modern Aristotelianism" of his earlier 1973 work, Humanism and Ideology.

In 2006, with Brookings Institution economist William T. Dickens, Flynn published "Black Americans reduce the racial IQ gap: evidence from standardization samples", which suggested that the difference in IQ scores between blacks and whites narrowed by four to seven points between 1972 and 2002, a conclusion contested by Jensen and controversial University of Western Ontario psychologist J. Philippe Rushton.

Flynn's 2007 book, What is Intelligence? Beyond the Flynn Effect, was dedicated to Jensen and revisited and expanded upon his earlier work from the 1980s.

During 2007, new research from the 2006 New Zealand census showed that women without a tertiary (college) education had produced 2.57 babies each, compared to 1.85 babies for those women with a higher education. During July 2007, The Sunday Star-Times quoted Flynn as saying that New Zealand risked having a less intelligent population and that a "persistent genetic trend which lowered the genetic quality for brain physiology would have some effect eventually". He referred to hypothetical eugenicists' suggestions for reversing the trend, including some sort of oral contraceptive "in the water supply and … an antidote" to conceive. Flynn later articulated his own views on the Close Up television programme in an interview with Paul Henry, suggesting that the Sunday Star-Times had grossly misrepresented his opinions. In the article, Flynn argued that he never intended for his suggestion to be taken seriously, as he only said this to illustrate a particular point.

Flynn continued teaching and was a prolific author in his later life, publishing almost a book every year in his last decade on a number of topics. Flynn wrote a variety of books. His research interests included humane ideals and ideological debate, classics of political philosophy, and race, class and IQ (see race and intelligence). His books combined political and moral philosophy with psychology to examine problems such as justifying humane ideals and whether it makes sense to rank races and classes by merit. Despite the success of his work on IQ, Flynn considered himself primarily a philosopher who had simply taken a "holiday" in psychology.

2008's Where have all the liberals gone? Race, class, and ideals in America argued that American liberalism had lost its way in response to alarmism from American conservatism.

In 2010, Flynn published The Torchlight List: Around the World in 200 Books, which analysed world literature and proposed that a person can learn more from reading great works of literature than they can from going to university.

Flynn published three books in 2012. Are We Getting Smarter? Rising IQ in the Twenty-First Century summarised his past IQ work and responded to criticisms, particularly regarding environmental causes for race and gender IQ gaps. Beyond patriotism: From Truman to Obama (2012) critiqued US foreign policy, and suggested people should put allegiance to the world community above national allegiances. Fate & philosophy: A journey through life's great questions discussed science, ethics, religion, and free will.

In July 2012, several media outlets reported Flynn as saying that women had, for the first time in a century, surpassed men on IQ tests based on a study he conducted in 2010. However, Flynn announced that the media had seriously distorted his results and went beyond his findings, revealing that he had instead discovered that the differences between men and women on one particular test, the Raven's Progressive Matrices, had become minimal in five modernised nations (whereas before 1982 women had scored significantly lower). Women, he argued, caught up with men in these nations as a result of exposure to modernity by entering the professions and being allowed greater educational access. Therefore, he said, when a total account of the Flynn effect is considered, women's closing the gap had moved them up in IQ slightly faster than men as a result. Flynn had previously documented this same trend among ethnic minorities and other disadvantaged groups. According to Flynn, the sexes are "dead equal on cognitive factors ... in their ability to deal with using logic on the abstract problems of Raven's", but that temperamental differences in the way boys and girls take the tests likely account for the tiny variations in mean scores, rather than any difference in intellectual ability.

Flynn's 2013 TED talk, "Why our IQ levels are higher than our grandparents'", has been viewed millions of times.

In 2016, Flynn published No Place to Hide: Climate Change: A short introduction for New Zealanders, in which he advocated climate engineering as a way to delay the effects of climate change until renewable energy becomes available.

In 2019, Flynn was told that his latest book, originally titled In Defense of Free Speech: The University as Censor, which examined whether modern universities continued to advance free inquiry and critical thinking, would not be published by the English publisher Emerald Group Publishing, who had previously accepted it and scheduled it for publication. Despite Flynn's stating that he was only summarising the positions of others with whom he disagreed, the book was originally thought too incendiary to be published. Dozens of academics, including Murray, defended Flynn, and a United States publisher, Academica Press, later published the book under the title A Book Too Risky to Publish: Free Speech and Universities. In the preface, Flynn stated that it was thought too controversial by Emerald under the United Kingdom's laws about hate speech as the intent is irrelevant if it is thought likely that "racial hatred could be stirred up as a result of the work".

He became an Honorary Fellow for life of the New Zealand Psychological Society and in 1998 received its Special Award. In 2002, he was awarded the university's gold medal for Distinguished Career Research. In 2007, he became a Distinguished Contributor of the International Society for Intelligence Research. He received an honorary Doctorate of Science from the University of Otago in 2010. He was a Fellow of the Royal Society of New Zealand and in 2011 received its Aronui Medal, Distinguished Visiting Fellow at the Hoover Institution, Distinguished Visiting Speaker at Cornell University, and Distinguished Associate of The Psychometrics Centre at Cambridge University. Flynn was a member of the editorial board of Intelligence and on the Honorary International Advisory Editorial Board of the Mens Sana Monographs.

Flynn retired in 2020. His cancer returned, and he underwent liver surgery that May. Flynn's wife described his final year as "difficult". Flynn died of intestinal cancer at Yvette Williams Retirement Village in Dunedin on 11 December 2020, aged 86.

== Partial bibliography ==
- Humanism and Ideology: an Aristotelian View. London and Boston: Routledge and Kegan Paul. 1973. ISBN 978-0-7100-7442-3.
- Race, IQ and Jensen. London and Boston: Routledge & Kegan Paul. 1980. ISBN 978-0-7100-0651-6. - Reviews the debate, as of 1980, about the research of Arthur Jensen and his critics.
- Flynn, James R. (1984). "The Mean IQ of Americans: Massive Gains 1932 to 1978" (PDF). Psychological Bulletin. 95: 29–51. doi:10.1037/0033-2909.95.1.29.
- Flynn, James R. (March 1987). "Massive IQ Gains in 14 Nations: What IQ Tests Really Measure" (PDF). Psychological Bulletin. 101 (2): 171–191. doi:10.1037/0033-2909.101.2.171.
- Asian Americans: Achievement Beyond IQ. Hillsdale, N.J.: L. Erlbaum Associates. 1991. ISBN 978-0-8058-1110-0.
- Flynn, James R. (1998). "IQ Gains over Time: Toward Finding the Causes". In Neisser, Ulric (ed.). The Rising Curve: Long-Term Gains in IQ and Related Measures. Washington (DC): American Psychological Association. pp. 25–66. ISBN 978-1-55798-503-3.
- Flynn, James R. (1999). "Searching for Justice: The Discovery of IQ Gains over Time" (PDF). American Psychologist. 54 (1): 5–20. doi:10.1037/0003-066X.54.1.5. Archived from the original on 27 March 2014.
- Flynn, James R. (2000). "IQ Gains, WISC Subtests and Fluid g: g Theory and the Relevance of Spearman's Hypothesis to Race". In Bock, Gregory; Goode, Jamie; Webb, Kate (eds.). The Nature of Intelligence (Novartis Foundation Symposium 233). Chichester: Wiley. pp. 202–227. ISBN 978-0-471-49434-8.
- Flynn, James R. (2000). "IQ Trends over Time: Intelligence, Race, and Meritocracy". In Arrow, Kenneth; Bowles, Samuel; Durlauf, Steven (eds.). Meritocracy and Economic Inequality. Princeton (NJ): Princeton University Press. pp. 35&–60. ISBN 978-0-691-00468-6.
- How to defend humane ideals: substitutes for objectivity. Lincoln, Neb.: University of Nebraska Press. 2000. ISBN 978-0-8032-1994-6.
- Dickens, W. T.; Flynn, J. R. (2001). "Heritability estimates versus large environmental effects: The IQ paradox resolved" (PDF). Psychological Review. 108 (2): 346–369. doi:10.1037/0033-295X.108.2.346. PMID 11381833. Archived from the original on 17 July 2020.
- Flynn, James R. (2009). What Is Intelligence: Beyond the Flynn Effect (expanded paperback ed.). Cambridge: Cambridge University Press. ISBN 978-0-521-74147-7.
  - C Shalizi (27 April 2009). "What Is Intelligence? Beyond the Flynn Effect". University of Michigan (Review). Archived from the original on 14 June 2010.
- Flynn, James R. (2008). Where Have All the Liberals Gone?: Race, Class, and Ideals in America. Cambridge, UK and New York: Cambridge University Press. ISBN 978-0-521-49431-1.
- The Torchlight List: Around the World in 200 Books. New Zealand: Awa Press. 2010. ISBN 978-0-9582916-9-9.
- Flynn, James R. (2012). Are We Getting Smarter? Rising IQ in the Twenty-First Century. Cambridge: Cambridge University Press. ISBN 978-1-107-60917-4.
  - Winerman, Lea (March 2013). "Smarter than ever?". Monitor on Psychology. 44 (3): 30.
- Fate & Philosophy: A Journey through Life's Great Questions. New Zealand: Awa Press. 2012. ISBN 978-1-877551-32-1.
- Flynn, James R. (2013). Intelligence and Human Progress: The Story of What was Hidden in our Genes (l ed.). Elsevier Inc. ISBN 978-0-12-417018-6.
- Flynn, James R. (2019). A Book Too Risky to Publish: Free Speech and Universities (l ed.). Academica Press. ISBN 978-1-68053-204-3.
