= Frank C. J. McGurk =

American psychologist (1910–1995)

- Born: 1910
- Died: 1995 (aged 84–85)
- Occupation: psychologist
- Known for: claims about race and intelligence

Frank C. J. McGurk (1910–1995) was an American psychologist who was noted for his claims about race and intelligence. McGurk taught at Lehigh University, Villanova University, West Point, and Alabama College.

McGurk's unpublished 1951 doctoral dissertation was cited by Arthur Jensen in Bias in Mental Testing. McGurk (1951) matched 213 black high-school students very closely to 213 white students and administered intelligence tests. Jensen claimed the test showed "blacks perform better on tests involving rote learning and memory than on tests involving relation education or reasoning and problem solving, especially with content of an abstract nature." In their review of the book, Darlington and Boyce obtained the unpublished dissertation and concluded that Jensen's summary was itself very biased. In 1987, Jensen and McGurk made a re-analysis of McGurk's data, writing that "McGurk’s results cannot be explained in terms of item biases, but appear to be the result of the noncultural items requiring more sheer reasoning ability than the cultural items, which depend more on acquired information."

In the debates that followed the Brown vs. Board of Education decision which ended segregation of the American public school system, McGurk claimed in U.S. News & World Report "that Negroes have less capacity for education than whites", thereby provoking numerous counter-arguments.

In 1959 McGurk told Wesley C. George that, "for the past three years, Villanova has censored me stiffly. I may not write without their specific approval .... That is what happens when priests do not fall into line."

== Bibliography ==
- McGurk, F. C. J., 1943, Comparative test scores of Negro and white school children in Richmond, Va. Journal of Educational Psychology, Vol 34(8), 473–484.
- McGurk, F. C. J. Comparison of the Performance of Negro and White High School Seniors on Cultural and Noncultural Psychological Test Questions. Washington, D.C.: Catholic University Press, 1951.
- McGurk, F. C. J. On white and Negro test performance and socio-economic factors. Journal of Abnormal and Social Psychology, 1953, 48, 448–450.
- McGurk, F. C. J. Socioeconomic status and culturally-weighted test scores of Negro subjects. Journal of Applied Psychology, 1953, 37, 216–211.
- McGurk, F. C. (1959). " Negro vs. white intelligence": An answer. Harvard Educational Review.
- Frank C. McGurk, The Law, Social Science and Academic Freedom - A Psychologist's View, 5 Vill. L. Rev. 247 (1959).
- McGurk, F. C. J. The culture hypothesis and psychological tests. In R. E. Kuttner (Ed.), Race and Modern Science, pp. 367–381. New York: Social Science Press, 1967.
- McGurk, F. C. (1971). TROUBLE ON THE CAMPUS: BLACK POWER'S EDUCATIONAL SYSTEM. Mankind Quarterly, 12(1), 12.
- McGurk, F. C. J. Race differences— twenty years later. Homo, 1975, 26, 219-239
- Robert T. Osborne, Frank C. J. McGurk, Audrey M. Shuey, eds. (1982). Testing of Negro Intelligence. Foundation for Human Understanding, ISBN 978-0-936396-02-6
