= Jensenism =

Jensenism is a term coined by New York Times writer Lee Edson. Named after educational psychologist Arthur Jensen, it was originally defined as "the theory that IQ is largely determined by the genes". The term was coined after Jensen published the article "How Much Can We Boost IQ and Scholastic Achievement?" in the Harvard Educational Review in 1969. It has since been included in several dictionaries.

== Background ==
The gap of the IQ between white and black students was a subject of debate in the United States, particularly around the 1970s. One view, which is referred to among behavioral geneticists as the genetic position, holds that IQ is determined by hereditary factors - about 80 percent of the variability of intelligence while 20 percent is attributed to environmental factors. The gap, therefore, was associated with race. Jensenism was as one of the most notable theories to have emerged from this sector. It was based on Arthur Jensen's 1969 article that talked about the failure of compensatory education. He cited several evidence that demonstrated how IQ is inherited. For instance, he said that if one looks at studies of adopted children, "you find that their intelligence relates more closely to their natural parents." He also proposed that the measured 15-point difference between American blacks and whites could never be eliminated by education.

== Reception ==
Many reactions to Jensen's article and the arguments it contained quickly ensued, some highly favorable and others relentlessly negative, with some directly equating it with racism. Among the latter was a paper by behavioral geneticist Jerry Hirsch, who claimed that Jensenism was an "intellectual disgrace", while also criticizing some of Jensen's earlier critics as resorting to "inarticulate and self-defeating hooliganism". In a 1970 article responding to Jensen, biologist Richard Lewontin argued that Jensenism was a more recent manifestation of 17th-century Jansenism, referring to the former as a "doctrine" that is "as erroneous in the twentieth century as it was in the seventeenth." Evolutionary biologist Stephen Jay Gould also criticized Jensenism, arguing that it rested "on a rotten edifice." Jensen's ideas reportedly received a more favorable reception in the Nixon administration; Lewontin quoted then-United States ambassador to India Daniel Patrick Moynihan in 1974 as saying, "The winds of Jensenism are blowing through Washington with gale force."

More recently, several favorable articles defending Jensen and his ideas have criticized the frequent negative use of the term "Jensenism". These include the journal Intelligence, which devoted an entire issue honoring Jensen and his work. Linda Gottfredson also claimed:

Arthur Jensen is a masterful scientist whose work broke a social taboo. Jensenism refers to the aspect of his work that violated the [social] taboo, specifically his conclusion that individual differences in intelligence are highly heritable and group differences may be too.

Despite such defenses, however, the current scientific consensus is that genetics do not explain IQ differences between racial groups.
