= PLUS test =

The PLUS test is a test distributed by Johns Hopkins University. Qualification requirements are good scores on the ERB's. The PLUS test was taken from 5th grade to 6th grade to get into Johns Hopkins's Center for Talented Youth. The PLUS Test is not given any longer, instead the School and College Ability Test is given. In 7th and 8th grade the SAT and/or ACT is taken.

Use of the PLUS test and the SCAT have been shown by Camilla Benbow and Julian Stanley to be useful in determining students' abilities in critical domains, in the evaluation of IQ.
