= Arthur Jensen =

American psychologist and writer (1923–2012)

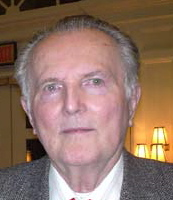
- Jensen in 2002 at ISIR
- Born: Arthur Robert Jensen; August 24, 1923; San Diego, California, U.S.
- Died: October 22, 2012 (aged 89); Kelseyville, California, U.S.
- Education: University of California, Berkeley (BA); San Diego State University (MA); Columbia University (PhD)
- Known for: Heritability of IQ, race and intelligence, g factor
- Spouse: Barbara Jensen
- Awards: Kistler Prize (2003), ISIR Lifetime Achievement Award (2006)
- Scientific career
- Fields: Educational psychology, intelligence, cognition, behavior genetics
- Workplaces: University of California, Berkeley, Editorial boards of Intelligence and Personality and Individual Differences
- Thesis: Aggression in Fantasy and Overt Behavior (1956)
- Doctoral advisor: Percival Symonds

Arthur Robert Jensen (August 24, 1923 – October 22, 2012) was an American psychologist and writer. He was a professor of educational psychology at the University of California, Berkeley. Jensen was known for his work in psychometrics and differential psychology, the study of how and why individuals differ behaviorally from one another.

He was a major proponent of the hereditarian position in the nature and nurture debate, the position that genetics play a significant role in behavioral traits, such as intelligence and personality. He was the author of over 400 scientific papers published in refereed journals and sat on the editorial boards of the scientific journals Intelligence and Personality and Individual Differences.

Jensen was controversial, largely for his conclusions regarding the causes of race-based differences in IQ.

== Early life and education ==
Jensen was born August 24, 1923, in San Diego, California, the son of Linda Mary (née Schachtmayer) and Arthur Alfred Jensen, who operated and owned a lumber and building materials company. His paternal grandparents were Danish immigrants and his mother was of half-Polish Jewish and half-German descent.

As a child, Jensen was interested in herpetology and classical music, playing clarinet in the San Diego Symphony orchestra.

Jensen received a B.A. in psychology from the University of California, Berkeley, in 1945 and went on to obtain his M.A. in psychology in 1952 from San Diego State College. He earned his Ph.D. in clinical psychology from Columbia University in 1956 under the supervision of Percival Symonds on the thematic apperception test. From 1956 through 1958, he did postdoctoral research at the University of London, Institute of Psychiatry with Hans Eysenck.

Upon returning to the United States, he became a researcher and professor at the University of California, Berkeley, where he focused on individual differences in learning, especially the influences of culture, development, and genetics on intelligence and learning. He received tenure at Berkeley in 1962. He concentrated on the learning difficulties of culturally disadvantaged students.

Jensen had a lifelong interest in classical music and was, early in his life, attracted by the idea of becoming a conductor himself. At 14, he conducted a band that won a nationwide contest held in San Francisco. Later, he conducted orchestras and attended a seminar given by Nikolai Sokoloff. Soon after graduating from Berkeley, he moved to New York, mainly to be near the conductor Arturo Toscanini. He was also deeply interested in the life and example of Gandhi, producing an unpublished book-length manuscript on his life. During Jensen's period in San Diego he spent time working as a social worker with the San Diego Department of Public Welfare.

== IQ and academic achievement ==
Jensen's interest in learning differences directed him to the extensive testing of school children. The results led him to distinguish between two separate types of learning ability. Level I, or associative learning, may be defined as retention of input and rote memorization of simple facts and skills. Level II, or conceptual learning, is roughly equivalent to the ability to manipulate and transform inputs, that is, the ability to solve problems.

Later, Jensen was an important advocate in the mainstream acceptance of the general factor of intelligence, a concept which was essentially synonymous with his Level II conceptual learning. The general factor, or g, is an abstraction that stems from the observation that scores on all forms of cognitive tests correlate positively with one another.

Jensen claimed, on the basis of his research, that general cognitive ability is essentially an inherited trait, determined predominantly by genetic factors rather than by environmental conditions. He also contended that while associative learning, or memorizing ability, is equally distributed among the races, conceptual learning, or synthesizing ability, occurs with significantly greater frequency in some races than in others.

Jensen's most controversial work, published in February 1969 in the Harvard Educational Review, was titled "How Much Can We Boost IQ and Scholastic Achievement?". It concluded, among other things, that Head Start programs designed to boost African-American IQ scores had failed, and that this was likely never to be remedied, largely because, in Jensen's estimation, 80% of the variance in IQ in the population studied was the result of genetic factors and the remainder was due to environmental influences. The paper immediately prompted weeks of violent protest on the Berkeley campus, with additional protests occurring throughout the 1970s.

The work became one of the most cited papers in the history of psychological testing and intelligence research, although a large number of citations consisted of rebuttals of Jensen's work, or references to it as an example of a controversial paper.

Jensen was among the most frequent contributors to the German journal Neue Anthropologie, a publication founded by the neo-Nazi Jürgen Rieger, and served alongside Rieger on this journal's editorial board.

In 1994 he was one of 52 signatories on "Mainstream Science on Intelligence," an essay written by Linda Gottfredson and published in The Wall Street Journal, which declared the consensus of the signing scholars on the meaning and significance of IQ following the publication of the book The Bell Curve. Jensen received $1.1 million from the Pioneer Fund, an organization frequently described as racist and white supremacist in nature. The fund contributed a total of $3.5 million to researchers cited in The Bell Curve's most controversial chapter "that suggests some races are naturally smarter than others" with Jensen's works being cited twenty-three times in the book's bibliography.

== Death ==
He died on October 22, 2012, at his home in Kelseyville, California, at age 89.

== Assessment ==
According to David Lubinski of Vanderbilt University, the "extent to which [Jensen's] work was either admired or reviled by many distinguished scientists is unparalleled."

After Jensen's death, James Flynn of the University of Otago, a prominent advocate of the environmental position, told The New York Times that Jensen was without racial bias and had not initially foreseen that his research would be used to argue for racial supremacy and that his career was "emblematic of the extent to which American scholarship is inhibited by political orthodoxy", though he noted that Jensen shifted towards genetic explanations later in life.

=== Support ===
After psychologist Paul E. Meehl was honored by the APA in 1998, he wrote in the journal Psychological Reports that Jensen's "contributions, in both quality and quantity, certainly excelled mine" and that he was "embarrassed" that APA had not also honored Jensen, which Meehl claimed was due to political correctness.

Psychologist Sandra Scarr wrote in the journal Intelligence in 1998 that Jensen possessed an "uncompromising personal integrity" and set the standard for "honest psychological science". She described his critics as "politically driven liars, who distort scientific facts in a misguided and condescending effort to protect an impossible myth about human equality".

Steven J. Haggbloom, writing for Review of General Psychology in 2002, rated Jensen as one of the 100 most eminent psychologists of the 20th century, based on six different metrics chosen by Haggbloom.

In 1980 Jensen published a book in defense of the tests used to measure mental abilities, titled Bias in Mental Testing. Reviewing this book, psychologist Kenneth Kaye endorsed Jensen's distinction between bias and discrimination, saying that he found many of Jensen's opponents to be more politically biased than Jensen was.

=== Criticism ===
Melvin Konner of Emory University, wrote:

Statements made by Arthur Jensen, William Shockley, and other investigators in the late 1960s and early 1970s about race and IQ or social class and IQ rapidly passed into currency in policy discussions. Many of these statements were proved wrong, but they had already influenced some policymakers, and that influence is very difficult to recant.

Lisa Suzuki and Joshua Aronson of New York University wrote that Jensen had largely ignored evidence which failed to support his position that IQ test score gaps represent genetic racial differences.

Paleontologist and evolutionary biologist Stephen Jay Gould criticized Jensen's work in his 1981 book The Mismeasure of Man. Gould writes that Jensen misapplies the concept of "heritability", which is defined as a measure of the variation of a trait due to inheritance within a population (Gould 1981: 127; 156–157). According to Gould, Jensen uses heritability to measure differences between populations. Gould also disagrees with Jensen's belief that IQ tests measure a real variable, g, or "the general factor common to a large number of cognitive abilities" which can be measured along a unilinear scale. This is a claim most closely identified with Charles Spearman. According to Gould, Jensen misunderstood the research of L. L. Thurstone to ultimately support this claim; Gould, however, argues that Thurstone's factor analysis of intelligence revealed g to be an illusion (1981: 159; 13-314). Gould criticizes Jensen's sources including his use of Catharine Cox's 1926 Genetic Studies of Genius, which examines historiometrically the IQs of historic intellectuals after their deaths (Gould 1981: 153–154).

== Books ==
=== Bias in Mental Testing ===
Bias in Mental Testing (1980) is a book examining the question of test bias in commonly used standardized tests. The book runs almost 800 pages and has been called "exhaustive" by three researchers who reviewed the field 19 years after the book's publication. It reviewed in detail the available evidence about test bias across major US racial/ethnic groups. Jensen concluded that "the currently most widely used standardized tests of mental ability -- IQ, scholastic aptitude, and achievement tests -- are, by and large, not biased against any of the native-born English-speaking minority groups on which the amount of research evidence is sufficient for an objective determination of bias, if the tests were in fact biased. For most nonverbal standardized tests, this generalization is not limited to English-speaking minorities." (p. ix). Jensen also published a summary of the book the same year which was a target article in the journal Behavioral and Brain Sciences to which 27 commentaries were printed along with the author's reply.

=== Straight Talk about Mental Tests ===
Straight Talk about Mental Tests (1981) is a book written about psychometrics for the general public. John B. Carroll reviewed it favorably in 1982, saying it was a useful summary of the issues, as did Paul Cline writing for the British Journal of Psychiatry. In 2016, Richard J. Haier called it "a clear examination of all issues surrounding mental testing".

=== The g Factor ===
The g Factor: The Science of Mental Ability (1998) is a book on the general intelligence factor (g). The book deals with the intellectual history of g and various models of how to conceptualize intelligence, and with the biological correlates of g, its heritability, and its practical predictive power.

=== Clocking the Mind ===
Clocking the Mind: Mental Chronometry and Individual Differences (2006) deals with mental chronometry (MC), and covers the speed with which the brain processes information and different ways this is measured. Jensen argues mental chronometry represents a true natural science of mental ability, which is in contrast to IQ, which merely represents an interval (ranking) scale and thus possesses no true ratio scale properties.

Joseph Glicksohn wrote in a 2007 review for Canadian Journal of Experimental Psychology that "The book should be perused with care in order to ensure the further profitable use of [reaction time] in both experimental and differential lines of research."

Douglas Detterman reviewed it in 2008 for Intelligence, writing that "the book would make a good introduction to the field of the measurement of individual differences in cognitive tasks for beginning graduate students." Eric-Jan Wagenmakers and Han van der Maas, also writing for Intelligence in 2018, faulted the book for omitting the work by mathematical psychologists, advocating standardization of chronometric methods (which the authors consider problematic because it can hide method variance), and because it does not discuss topics such as the mutualism model of the g-factor and the Flynn effect. They describe the book's breadth as useful, despite its simplistic approach. Jensen was on the editorial board of Intelligence when these reviews were published.

== Awards ==
In 2003, Jensen was awarded the Kistler Prize for original contributions to the understanding of the connection between the human genome and human society. In 2006, the International Society for Intelligence Research awarded Jensen its Lifetime Achievement Award.

== See also ==
- Heritability of IQ
- Race and intelligence
- History of the race and intelligence controversy
- Jensen box
