= Dragoș Iliescu =

Romanian psychologist

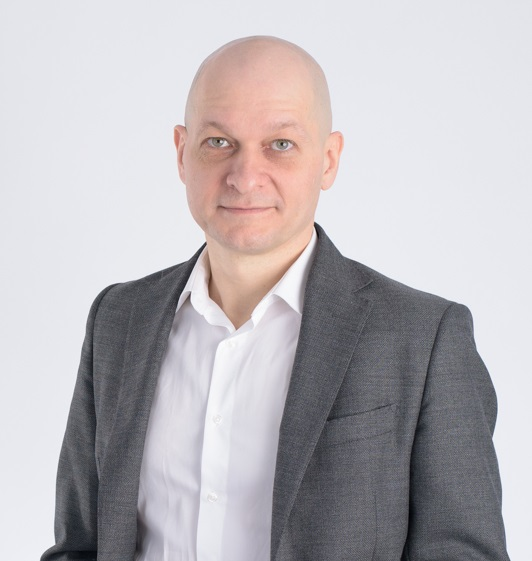
Professor Dragoș Iliescu

Dragoș Iliescu (born November 5, 1974) is a Romanian psychologist and academic. He holds the position of professor of psychology at Bucharest University in Romania and serves as an Extraordinary professor at Stellenbosch University in South Africa. Since 2017, he has been the director of the doctoral school of psychology and educational science at Bucharest University.

== Education ==
Dragoș Iliescu was born in Brașov, Romania, where he attended the German Honterus-Kolleg until grade 8 and subsequently enrolled at the Grigore Moisil National College of Computer Science. In 1997, he graduated from the National Intelligence Academy in Bucharest with a bachelor's degree in socio-psychology. He obtained a Ph.D. in psychology from Babeș-Bolyai University in 2003, with a thesis titled "Psychosocial Aspects of Organizational Change," supervised by Professor Horia Pitariu. His areas of specialization include psychometrics, psychological and educational assessment, as well as work and organizational psychology.

== Service in scientific organizations ==
In Romania, Iliescu has participated in various scientific and professional organizations, holds leadership positions in two of them. He is a co-founder of the Romanian Association of Industrial and Organizational Psychology and served as a council member for two terms, from 2002 to 2010 and again from 2013 to 2020. He was the association's president from 2010 to 2013. Additionally, he has held the position of Secretary-General of the Romanian Psychological Association since 2017.

Internationally, Iliescu has held leadership positions in several scientific and professional organizations.

He has served as a council member of the International Test Commission from 2008 to 2018, during which he held the position of council member, secretary-general, and president. His tenure as president represents the highest position in a professional international association held by a Romanian. In 2018, he was recognized for his contribution to the International Test Commission and was named "Fellow of the ITC."

As of May 2019, Iliescu serves as the treasurer of the European Association for Work and Organization Psychology. He has been the president of Division 2 (Psychology Assessment and Evaluation) of the International Association of Applied Psychology (IAAP) since 2022, having held the position of President-Elect since 2018. Additionally, he has been the Secretary-General of the European Network for Organizational Psychology (ENOP) since 2023.

He has served as editor-in-chief of the European Journal of Psychological Assessment from 2021 to 2024. and is currently the Editor-in-Chief of Intelligence (co-Editor with Samuel Greiff).

== Entrepreneurship ==
Iliescu has founded and managed several businesses that focus on the applications of psychology in various settings. In 1999, he established D&D Research, a company specializing in market research and consumer psychology. In 2003, he founded Testcentral Romania, which has become the primary publisher of psychological tests in Romania. In 2012, he launched 42 Organizational Assessment, a talent assessment company that serves as the SHL distributor for Romania, Bulgaria, Serbia, and the Czech Republic. In 2016, he founded Brio Romania, which has become the primary platform for educational standardized testing in Romania.

== Research ==
Dragoș Iliescu's research focuses on individual differences, including cognitive abilities and personality. His work addresses these areas from both assessment and applied perspectives.

He was the Chair of the ITC task force that developed and published in 2023 The Test Adaptation Reporting Standards (TARES).

== Bibliography ==
- Leong, Frederick T. L.; Bartram, Dave; Cheung, Fanny M.; Iliescu, Dragoș, eds. (2016). The ITC international handbook of testing and assessment. New York (N.Y.): Oxford University Press. ISBN 978-0199356942. OCLC 941875084.
- Iliescu, Dragoș (2017). Adapting tests in linguistic and cultural situations. New York: Cambridge University Press. doi:10.1017/9781316273203. ISBN 9781316273203. OCLC 1006380957.
- Iliescu, Dragoş (2023). Testarea Standardizată în Educație [Standardized Testing in Education] (in Romanian). București: HUMANITAS. ISBN 9789735081492. OCLC 1511479067.
