= Michael J. A. Howe =

British cognitive psychologist

Michael Howe
- Born: 1940
- Died: 2 January 2002 (aged 61–62)

Academic background
- Education: University of Sheffield
- Thesis: Studies of recall and storage in short-term memory (1966)

Academic work
- Discipline: Psychology
- Sub-discipline: Cognitive psychology
- Institutions: University of Exeter

Michael John Anthony Howe (1940 – 2 January 2002) was a British cognitive psychologist. He was well known as a defender of environmental influences on intelligence, and as an opponent of IQ, and he was regularly involved in the controversies surrounding that area of research (see, e.g., Howe, 1997b). As a widely cited example of this work, with colleagues Davidson and Sloboda, he argued against the existence of innate talent, a position welcomed by some, but characterised as "absurd environmentalism" by researchers such as Douglas Detterman.

== Early life and education ==
Howe took BSc and PhD degrees at the University of Sheffield and worked at North American universities (Dalhousie, Tufts and Alberta) before taking a post as lecturer at the University of Exeter in England, where he worked for the rest of his career, eventually becoming the university's first Professor of Cognitive Psychology.

== Career ==
Howe pioneered the use of biography as a means of investigation within modern cognitive psychology (e.g. Howe, 1997a). He particularly applied it to the study of musical genius and other exceptional abilities, a subject that he investigated extensively (e.g. Howe, 1990, 1999), including the abilities of "idiot savants" (e.g. Howe, 1989). He wrote over 20 books, including university text books (e.g. Howe, 1977, 1998) and more popular works (e.g. Howe & Griffey, 1995). His books were widely translated and, in 2008, many were still in print.

== Later life and death ==
Howe formally retired in 2001 but continued his academic work without interruption. He died suddenly on 2 January 2002 following a stroke.

== Selected bibliography ==
- Howe, M. J. A. (1977), Adult learning. Chichester: Wiley.
- Howe, M. J. A. (1989), Fragments of genius: the strange feats of idiot savants. London: Routledge
- Howe, M. J. A. (1990), The origins of exceptional abilities. Oxford: Basil Blackwell.
- Howe, M. J. A. (1997a), "Beyond psychobiography: towards more effective syntheses of psychology and biography". British Journal of Psychology, 88, 235–248.
- Howe, M. J. A. (1997b), IQ in question: The truth about intelligence. London: Sage.
- Howe, M. J. A. (1998), Principles of abilities and human learning. Hove: Psychology Press.
- Howe, M. J. A. (1999), Genius explained. Cambridge: Cambridge University Press.
- Howe, M. J. A., & Griffey, H. (1995), Give your child a better start: how to encourage early learning. London: Penguin.
