= Grigore Moisil National College of Computer Science (Brașov) =

- Colegiul Național de Informatică Grigore Moisil
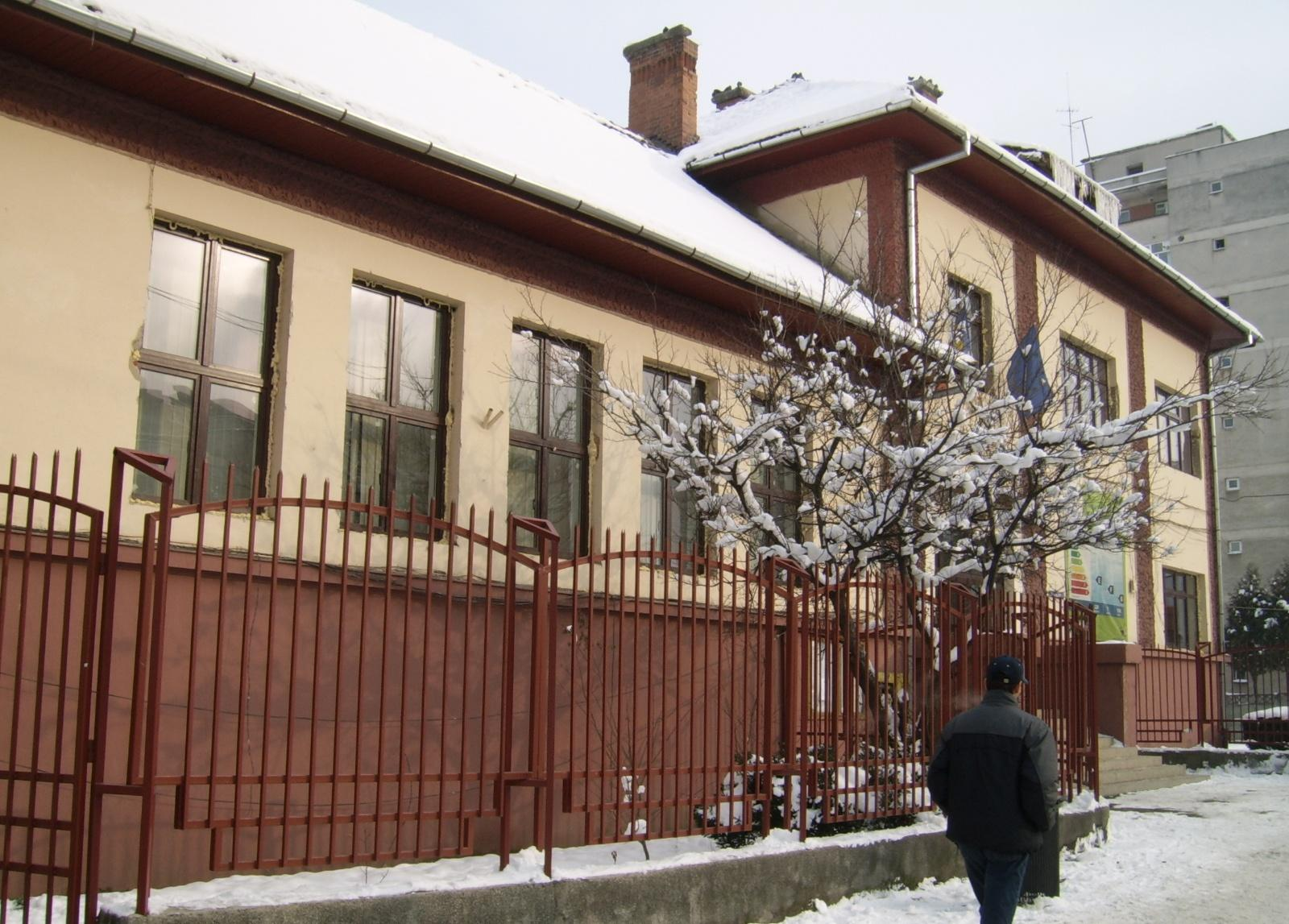
- First building (1938)

Location
- Calea București 75, Brașov 500326; Romania; 45.6444°N 25.6246°E

Information
- Type: High school
- Established: 1938
- Headmaster: Carmen Andrei
- Grades: 9–12
- Enrollment: 672
- Website: moisilbrasov.ro
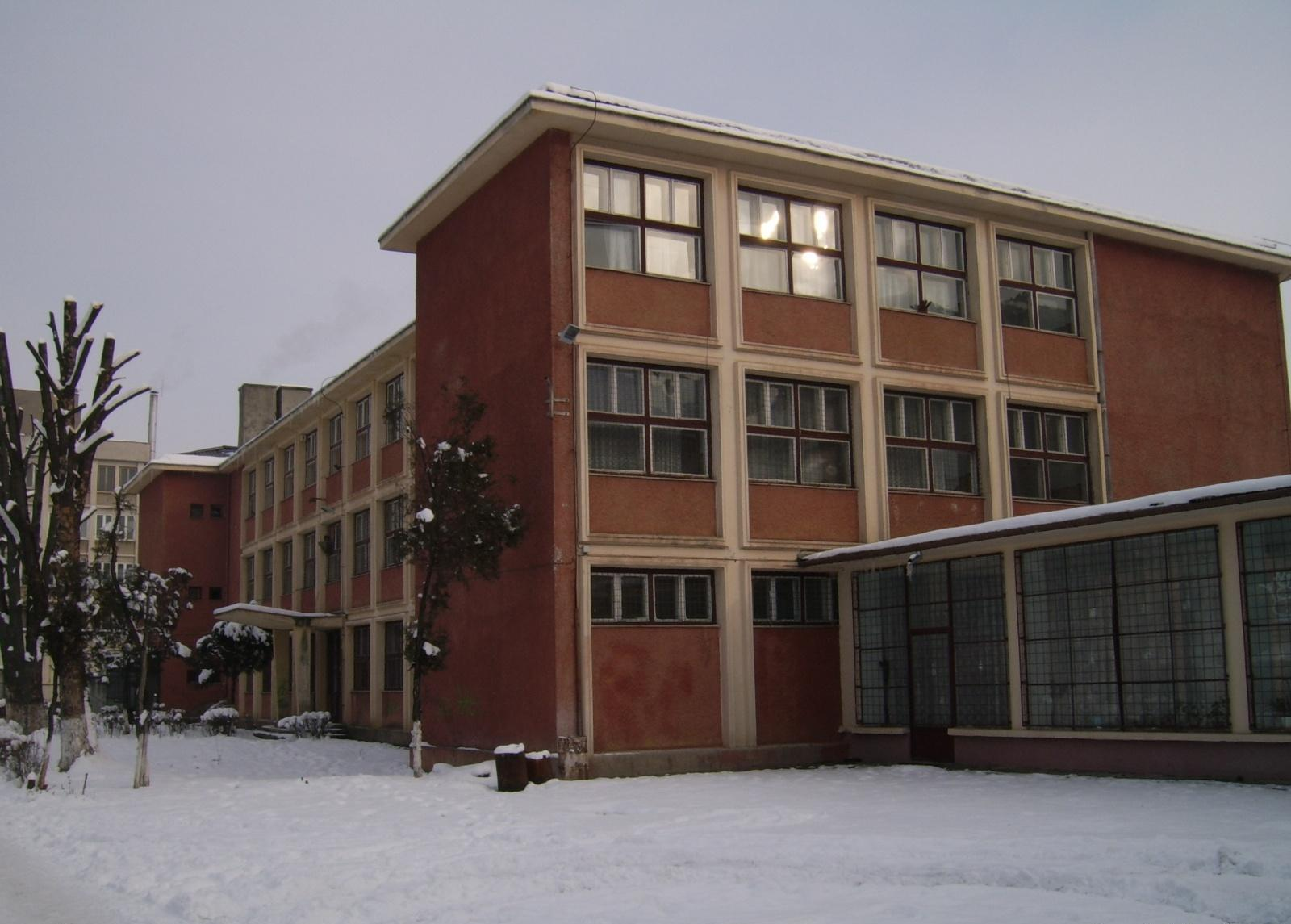
- Second building (1960)

Grigore Moisil National College of Computer Science (Romanian: Colegiul Național de Informatică Grigore Moisil) is a high school located at 75 Calea București, Brașov, Romania, that carries the name of academician Grigore Moisil, the "founder" of Romanian computer science.

== History ==
The history of the high school dates to 1938.

- Since the first part of the building was constructed in 1938, it has been the home of five institutions: Primary Schools 3 and 11, and later on, Secondary Schools 2, 6, and 4.
- Along with the construction of the second building in 1960, the name was changed to "General Culture High School number 4".
- The school year 1972 sees the introduction of a new profile, top notch at the time, and a new name for the school: "High School for Automatic Data Processing", which concerned computer science.
- During 1973–1977 and 1990–2002, the institution's name was "Computer Science High School" (Romanian: Liceul de Informatică), while between 1977–1990 it was called "Mathematics–Physics High School number 1" (Romanian: Liceul de Matematică–Fizică nr. 1).
- In 2002, it took the name of "Grigore Moisil Computer Science National College".

== Classes ==
- Since 1990, the school has had, for each year
  - 4 classes of intensive – computer science profile
  - 1 class of intensive – English profile
- There are a total of 20 classes (15 computer sciences + 5 English)
- There are 28 students per class. That means 140 per year and a total of 700.
- After admission, the top 28 that opt for the English class are sent to class 9A, and the rest are assigned, randomly and in equal proportions to classes 9B to 9E.
- The high school only has day program.
- Class hours are usually held Monday to Friday, from 8:00 AM to 3:00 PM.
- There are 1 class for every middle school grade. You can take an exam to enter from 5th grade to this school and make the rest of middle school there.

== Notable graduates ==
Notable graduates of the high school include:

- Dumitru Prunariu (b. 1952) – first Romanian cosmonaut; currently, division general with 2 stars, in reserve
- Ioan Ghișe (b. 1956) – Romanian politician, member of PNL, former mayor of Brașov (1996–2004)
- Dragoș Iliescu (b. 1974), academic
- Victor Socaciu (b. 1953) – Romanian folk musicians; in the jury of the Golden Stag
- Dan Bălteanu (b. 1943) – academician, director of the Romanian Institute of Geography
- Daniel Capatos (b. 1973) – reality show host
- Mihai Dobrovolski (b. 1974) – radio host, founder of Radio Guerilla
- Raluca Arvat (b. 1975) – journalist, sport news section host for Pro TV
- Ernest Takacs (b. 1980) – TV presenter
