= Bias in Mental Testing =

Book by Arthur Jensen

- Author: Arthur R. Jensen
- Publisher: Free Press
- Publication date: 1980
- Pages: 786
- ISBN: 0-029-16430-3

Bias in Mental Testing is a book by Arthur Jensen about bias in IQ tests.

== Background ==
In 1969, Arthur Jensen's article "How Much Can We Boost IQ and Scholastic Achievement?" initiated an immense controversy because of its suggestion that the reason for the difference in average IQ between African Americans and White Americans might involve genetic as well as cultural factors. One argument against this idea was that IQ tests are culturally biased against African Americans, and that any observed difference in average IQ must therefore be an artifact of the tests themselves. In the 1970s Jensen began researching the idea of test bias, and soon decided it would be beneficial to write a book reviewing the matter. Although he at first intended the book to be rather short, over the course of writing it he came to realize that the topic deserved a much more in-depth analysis, and the book eventually grew into something much larger.

== Summary ==
The book is based on the fact that the average IQ of African Americans had been consistently found to lie approximately 15 points lower than that of White Americans, and the accusation made by some psychologists that IQ tests are therefore culturally biased against African Americans. The book does not address the question of whether the cause of the IQ gap is genetic or environmental, but only whether the tests themselves are valid.

The book presents several arguments that IQ tests are not biased. African Americans' lower average performance on IQ tests cannot be because of differences in vocabulary, because African Americans have slightly better performance on verbal tests than on nonverbal tests. The IQ difference also cannot be because the tests depend on White culture, or that Whites inevitably do better on tests designed by Whites. In fact, Blacks perform better on tests that are culturally loaded than they do on tests designed to not include cultural references unfamiliar to Blacks, and Japanese children tend to outscore White children by an average of six points. Nor can the difference be a reflection of socioeconomic status, because when Black and White children are tested who are at the same socioeconomic level, the difference between their average IQs is still twelve points.

The book also presents evidence that IQ tests work the same way for all English-speaking Americans born in the United States, regardless of race. One is that IQ tests have been very successful in predicting performance for all Americans in school, work, and the armed forces. Another is that the race and sex of the person administering a test does not significantly affect how African Americans perform on it. The ranking in difficulty of test items on IQ tests is the same for both groups, and so is the overall shape of the graph showing the number of people achieving each score, except that the curve is centered slightly lower for Blacks than it is for Whites.

Based on this data, Jensen concludes that tests which show a difference in average IQ between races are showing something real, rather than an artifact of the tests themselves. He argues that in competition for college admission and jobs, IQ tests have the potential to be more fair than many of the alternatives, because they can judge ability in a way that's colorblind instead of relying on the judgement of an interviewer.

== Reception and impact ==
The journal Behavioral and Brain Sciences devoted an issue to Bias in Mental Testing in 1981, publishing 28 reviews of the book. The 1984 book Perspectives on Bias in Mental Testing was written in response to the book. It is a collection of chapters by several authors on the topic of test bias, although not all of them respond directly to Jensen's book. Some of these chapters are supportive of Jensen's conclusions, while others give competing viewpoints. One criticism of the book argues that while Jensen's data shows test bias is not a sufficient explanation for the black/white IQ gap, it does not support his conclusion that no test bias exists at all. Lorrie A. Shepard writes, "Bias in the tests cannot explain away the observed difference between blacks and whites. But the evidence reviewed here does not support the conclusion that there is absolutely no bias nor the dismissing of the bias issue as a worth scientific question."

Bias and Mental Testing has been subject to over 200 book reviews, and has been listed by the journal Current Contests as a citation classic. It also is described as the definitive text on the topic of bias in IQ tests. The content of the reviews has ranged from technical criticisms to ad hominem attacks and extravagant praise.

A 1999 literature review re-examined the conclusions of Bias in Mental Testing using new data. It concluded that empirical evidence strongly supported Jensen's conclusion that mental tests are equally valid measures of ability for all English-speaking people born in the United States. The review further argued that misinformation about bias in IQ tests is very pervasive, and thus it is important for the empirical data in this field to be clearly conveyed to the public.
