= Victor Flynn =

British mathematician

- Born: Eugene Victor Flynn; Washington, D.C., U.S.
- Education: University of Otago; Trinity College, Cambridge
- Scientific career
- Fields: Mathematics
- Workplaces: University of Michigan; University of Liverpool; University of Cambridge; University of Oxford
- Thesis: Curves of genus 2 (1989)
- Doctoral advisor: J. W. S. Cassels
- Relatives: James Flynn (father)

Eugene Victor Flynn is an American-born mathematician. He is currently a professor of mathematics at New College, Oxford.

== Biography ==
Victor Flynn was born in Washington, D.C. while his father, James Flynn, had recently accepted a position at the University of Otago. He was named after Eugene Victor Debs, a multiple-time presidential candidate for the Socialist Party of America. Victor Flynn enrolled at the University of Otago before pursuing a PhD at Trinity College, Cambridge, where he was supervised by J. W. S. Cassels. Flynn's PhD was on the arithmetic of elliptic curves and algebraic geometry. After spending a year as an assistant professor at the University of Michigan, he returned to Cambridge as a research fellow at Robinson College. He then moved to the University of Liverpool, including four years as head of the pure mathematics department there. In 2005, Flynn left Liverpool to move to the University of Oxford where he took up a fellowship at New College. He was appointed as a university professor of mathematics in October 2006, a position he has held since. Flynn's most recent publication is an article published in the November 2024 issue of Mathematics of Computation, a journal of the American Mathematical Society.

== Family ==
Flynn's father, James Flynn, was a prominent researcher in the fields of intelligence and IQ testing, best known for his work on the Flynn effect. He died in 2020. Victor Flynn's parents met while protesting racial segregation in the United States.
