= Wesley Critz George =

- Born: 1888
- Died: 1982 (aged 93–94)
- Education: University of North Carolina at Chapel Hill
- Occupation: Academic

Wesley Critz George (1888–1982) was an American academic. He was Professor of histology and embryology and Chair of the Department of Anatomy at the University of North Carolina at Chapel Hill from 1940 to 1949. He was a eugenicist and a segregationist.

== Early life ==
Wesley Critz George was born in 1888. He graduated from the University of North Carolina at Chapel Hill, where he received a bachelor of arts degree in 1911, followed by a master's degree in 1912. He received a PhD in Zoology from the same institution in 1918.

== Career ==
George was professor of biology at Guilford College from 1916 to 1917. He was a Maude Fellow at Princeton University in 1918. He became an adjunct professor of biology at the University of Georgia in 1919, and an associate professor of historology and embryology at the University of Tennessee from 1919 to 1920.

George returned to his alma mater, the University of North Carolina at Chapel Hill, where he was associate professor of anatomy from 1920 to 1924, and chair of the Department of Anatomy from 1940 to 1949 at the University of North Carolina at Chapel Hill. He became Professor Emeritus in 1949.

Beginning with studies of sponges and tunicates, he became an internationally recognized researcher on the genetics of race. George is remembered for his 87-page pamphlet, The Biology of the Race Problem, printed for the Commission of the Governor (John Patterson) of Birmingham, Alabama, 1962.

== Views on race ==
George argued that the division between Black and White races was founded on fundamental biological differences. He saved special venom for Franz Boas and the Boasian physical anthropologists who argued that race was of no biological consequence. George used some of the results of intelligence tests that Arthur Jensen and Charles Murray and others used later as evidence of lower average intelligence among Blacks.

After the 1954 Supreme Court Brown v. Board of Education decision, George's fight against school integration escalated, reaching its height in 1955 - 1957, when George was active in the Patriots of North Carolina and then in the North Carolina Defenders of States' Rights which picked up the anti-integration banner after the Patriots' demise.

A 1961 article in The Citizens' Council quoted George as saying,

We badly need the states to establish and support offices to present the evil side of race amalgamation ... we have truth and virtue on our side.

George served on the Executive Committee of the International Association for the Advancement of Ethnology and Eugenics.

== Death and legacy ==
George died in 1982. His papers are preserved at the University of North Carolina at Chapel Hill.
