= Percival Symonds =

American educational psychologist

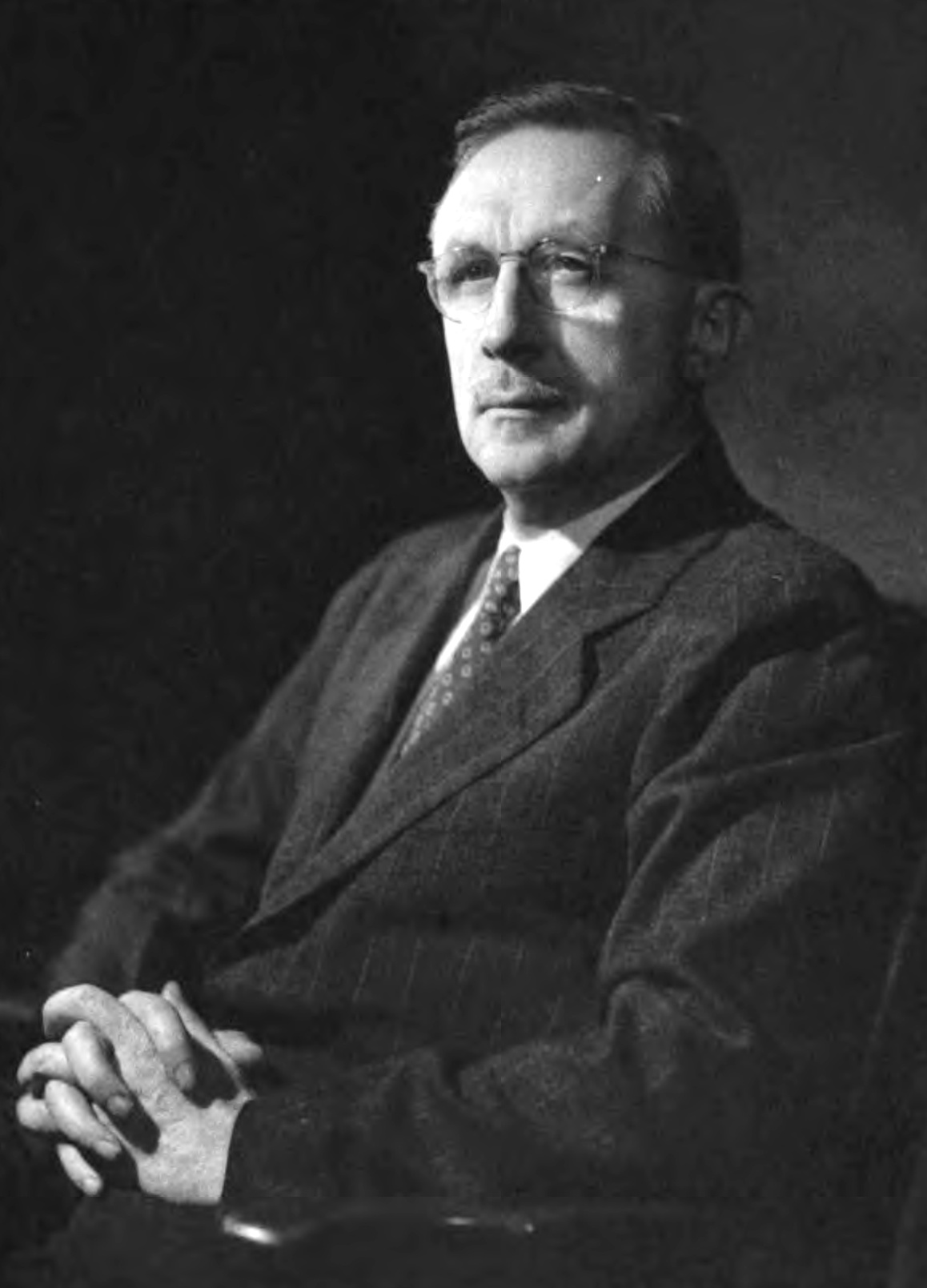
- Born: Percival Mallon Symonds; April 18, 1893; Newtonville, Massachusetts
- Died: August 6, 1960 (aged 67); Salem, Massachusetts
- Education: Harvard University (B.A.); Columbia University (M.A., Ph.D)
- Scientific career
- Fields: Educational psychology
- Workplaces: University of Hawaii; Teachers College, Columbia University
- Thesis: Special disability in algebra (1923)
- Doctoral advisor: Edward Thorndike
- Doctoral students: Arthur Jensen

Percival Mallon Symonds (April 18, 1893 – August 6, 1960) was an American educational psychologist. He was known for his development of several tests in the fields of educational, clinical, and school psychology, including the Foreign Language Prognosis Test, the Personality Survey, and the Symonds picture-study test, a projective test administered to adolescents.

== Early life and education ==
Percival Mallon Symonds was born on April 18, 1893, in Newtonville, Massachusetts, to Joseph Ainsworth Symonds and Abbie Kendall Mallon.

He received preliminary education in the public schools in West Newton. He then received his B.A. from Harvard University in 1915, followed by an A.M. and Ph.D. from Columbia University in 1920 and 1923, respectively.

== Career ==
Symonds first taught at Punchard High School in Andover during 1915 to 1917 and then at Worcester Academy from 1917 to 1918. During World War I, he did statistical work on ballistics at the Aberdeen Proving Ground by the U.S. Army Ordnance Department from 1918 to 1919. He would later work at an actuarial department of a life insurance company.

After a year of advanced study in Mathematics in Columbia University, he taught during the summer session in the University in 1920. He became assistant to Edward Thorndike in Teachers College, Columbia University, in 1921 to 1922.

He served as the first chairman of the American Association of Applied Psychologists' Education Section and, from 1947 to 1948, as president of the American Psychological Association's Division of Educational Psychology. He was also president of the American Educational Research Association from 1956 to 1957.

He was a professor of education and psychology at the University of Hawaii from 1922 to 1924. In 1924, he began teaching at the Teachers College, Columbia University, where he remained a faculty member until his retirement in 1958. He died on August 6, 1960, in Salem, Massachusetts.

== Research ==
Symonds researched the relationship between personality traits in teachers and their teaching abilities. His work, which included twenty-one books and over two hundred articles, emphasized the importance of dynamic psychology.
