= J. W. S. Cassels =

British mathematician (1922–2015)

- Born: 11 July 1922; Durham, County Durham, England
- Died: 27 July 2015 (aged 93); Cambridge, England
- Other name: Ian Cassels
- Education: University of Edinburgh (MA); Trinity College, Cambridge (PhD)
- Awards: De Morgan Medal (1986); Royal Society Sylvester Medal (1973); Fellow of the Royal Society (1963)
- Scientific career
- Fields: Mathematics
- Workplaces: University of Cambridge
- Doctoral advisor: Louis Mordell
- Doctoral students: Bryan John Birch; José Felipe Voloch; Victor Flynn

John William Scott "Ian" Cassels, FRS (11 July 1922 – 27 July 2015) was a British mathematician.

== Biography ==
Cassels was educated at Neville's Cross Council School in Durham and George Heriot's School in Edinburgh. He went on to study at the University of Edinburgh and graduated with an undergraduate Master of Arts (MA) degree in 1943.

His academic career was interrupted in World War II when he was involved in cryptography at Bletchley Park. After the war he became a research student of Louis Mordell at Trinity College, Cambridge; he received his PhD in 1949 and was elected a fellow of Trinity in the same year.

Cassels then spent a year lecturing in mathematics at the University of Manchester before returning to Cambridge as a lecturer in 1950. He was appointed Reader in Arithmetic in 1963, the same year he was elected as a fellow of the Royal Society of London. In 1967 he was appointed as Sadleirian Professor of Pure Mathematics at Cambridge. In 1969 he became Head of the Department of Pure Mathematics and Mathematical Statistics. He retired in 1984.

== Mathematical work ==
He initially worked on elliptic curves. After a period when he worked on geometry of numbers and diophantine approximation, he returned in the later 1950s to the arithmetic of elliptic curves, writing a series of papers connecting the Selmer group with Galois cohomology and laying some of the foundations of the modern theory of infinite descent. His best-known single result may be the proof that the Tate-Shafarevich group of an elliptic curve, if it is finite, must have order that is a square; the proof being by construction of an alternating form.

Cassels often studied individual Diophantine equations by algebraic number theory and p-adic methods.

His publications include 200 papers. His advanced textbooks have influenced generations of mathematicians; some of Cassels's books have remained in print for decades.

== Publications ==
- Cassels, J. W. S. (1957), An introduction to Diophantine approximation, Cambridge Tracts in Mathematics and Mathematical Physics, vol. 45, Cambridge University Press
- Cassels, J. W. S. (1997) [1959], An Introduction to the Geometry of Numbers, Springer Classics in Mathematics, Springer-Verlag
- Cassels, J. W. S. (1966), "Diophantine equations with special reference to elliptic curves", J. London Math. Soc., 41: 193–291, doi:10.1112/jlms/s1-41.1.193, MR 0199150
- Cassels, J. W. S. (1978), Rational quadratic forms, London Mathematical Society Monographs, vol. 13, London-New York: Academic Press, Inc. [Harcourt Brace Jovanovich, Publishers], ISBN 0-12-163260-1, MR 0522835
- Cassels, J.W.S. (1981). Economics for Mathematicians. London Mathematical Society Lecture Note Series. Vol. 62. Cambridge-New York: Cambridge University Press. pp. xi+145. ISBN 0-521-28614-X. MR 0657578.
- Cassels, J. W. S. (1986), Local fields, London Mathematical Society Student Texts, vol. 3, Cambridge: Cambridge University Press, doi:10.1017/CBO9781139171885, ISBN 0-521-30484-9, MR 0861410
- Cassels, J. W. S (1991), Lectures on elliptic curves, London Mathematical Society Student Texts, vol. 24, Cambridge: Cambridge University Press, doi:10.1017/CBO9781139172530, ISBN 0-521-41517-9, MR 1144763
- Cassels, J. W. S.; Flynn, E. V. (1996), Prolegomena to a middlebrow arithmetic of curves of genus 2, London Mathematical Society Lecture Note Series, vol. 230, Cambridge: Cambridge University Press, doi:10.1017/CBO9780511526084, ISBN 0-521-48370-0, MR 1406090

== See also ==
- Cassels' conjecture
- Littlewood conjecture
