= Michael A. McDaniel =

American psychologist

- Education: George Washington University
- Known for: Personnel selection
- Awards: Dean's Scholar from Virginia Commonwealth University (2016–2017)
- Scientific career
- Fields: Industrial psychology
- Workplaces: Virginia Commonwealth University
- Thesis: The evaluation of a causal model of job performance: the interrelationships of general mental ability, job experience, and job performance (1986)

Michael A. McDaniel is an American industrial and organizational psychologist and Emeritus Professor in the Department of Management at Virginia Commonwealth University, where he was concurrently a research professor in the Department of Psychology. He is known for his research on personnel selection and publication bias, as well as on the relationship between brain size and intelligence. His current research interests include personnel selection, publication bias, and research integrity. He was employed at Work Skills First, Inc., a human resource consulting firm specializing in personnel selection and expert witness services related to personnel selection. He retired in 2024. He was elected as a Fellow into the American Psychological Association, the Association for Psychological Science, and the Society for Industrial and Organizational Psychology. In 2015, he served a one-year term as president of the International Society for Intelligence Research (ISIR).
