= Douglas K. Detterman =

American psychologist

- Born: 1942 (age 83–84)
- Citizenship: American
- Education: Boston University (BA); University of Alabama (MA, PhD)
- Known for: Founder of the Intelligence journal
- Awards: Mensa Research Award (1991)
- Scientific career
- Fields: Intelligence, mental retardation
- Workplaces: University of Dayton, Case Western Reserve University

Douglas K. Detterman (born 1942) is an American psychologist who researches intelligence and intellectual disability.

== Biography ==
He earned his B.A. from Boston University in 1967, his M.A. and Ph.D. from University of Alabama in 1972 and was a postdoctoral fellow at Northwestern University in 1972.

Detterman taught at University of Dayton from 1970 to 1972, then took a position at Case Western Reserve University, where he has remained since.

Among his achievements, Detterman founded the scientific journal Intelligence in 1977, and was editor in chief from 1977 to 2016, when it was taken over by Richard Haier. He also founded the International Society for Intelligence Research and was its president until 2011. He has also been a Fellow of the American Psychological Association from 1978 to 1998, a Fellow and charter member of the American Psychological Society from 1990 to 1998, and received a Mensa Research Award in 1991.

In 1995, he was a signatory of a collective statement in response to public discussion of the book The Bell Curve titled "Mainstream Science on Intelligence," written by Intelligence editor Linda Gottfredson and published in The Wall Street Journal and reprinted in Intelligence in 1997. He also collaborated on several books on intelligence with psychologist Robert J. Sternberg.

Detterman has argued that it is unfair to tell people they can accomplish anything if they just put enough practice into it, since they are limited by their abilities. Similarly, he has argued that cognitive training does not increase intelligence, but only one's ability to take tests, and notes the poor quality of studies done by commercial brain training companies (see also Lumosity#Effectiveness and legal history). Instead, he advises parents to save their money.

== Publications ==
- Sternberg R, Detterman DK. What is Intelligence? : Contemporary Viewpoints on its Nature and Definition. Ablex Publishing (1986). ISBN 0-89391-389-8
- Detterman DK, Sternberg R. How and How Much Can Intelligence Be Increased. Ablex Publishing (1982). ISBN 0-89391-117-8.
- Detterman DK (ed.). The Environment: (Current Topics in Human Intelligence). Ablex Publishing (1996). ISBN 1-56750-136-2.
- Detterman DK, Sternberg R. Transfer on Trial: Intelligence, Cognition and Instruction. Ablex Publishing (1993). ISBN 0-89391-826-1.
- Detterman DK. Research Methodology: (Current Topics in Human Intelligence). Ablex Publishing (1985). ISBN 0-89391-173-9.
- Detterman DK. Theories in Intelligence: (Current Topics in Human Intelligence). Ablex Publishing (1994). ISBN 1-56750-103-6.
- Detterman DK. Is Mind Modular or Unitary?: (Current Topics in Human Intelligence). Ablex Publishing (1992). ISBN 0-89391-703-6.
- Sternberg R, Detterman DK. Human Intelligence: Perspectives on Its Theory and Measurement (Hardcover). Ablex Publishing (1979). ISBN 0-89391-030-9.
- Detterman DK. Individual Differences and Cognition: (Current Topics in Human Intelligence). Ablex Publishing (1993). ISBN 0-89391-860-1.
