= Camilla Benbow =

American educational psychologist

Camilla Persson Benbow is a Swedish-born (Scania) American educational psychologist and a university professor. She studies the education of intellectually gifted students.

== Biography ==
Camilla Benbow is the Patricia and Rodes Hart Dean of Education and Human Development at Vanderbilt University's Peabody College. She is an educational psychologist who has focused on education of intellectually gifted young people. Benbow is co-director (with David Lubinski) of the Study of Mathematically Precocious Youth (SMPY), a longitudinal study that examines the development of over 5,000 individuals over their life-spans. Her interests focus on identifying education that is most effective to developing intellectual talent in science, technology, engineering, and mathematics.

Benbow received her undergraduate and graduate education at Johns Hopkins University, including the Ed.D., with distinction, in 1981. She became associate research scientist at Johns Hopkins University in 1981. In 1986, Iowa State University appointed her Associate Professor of Psychology promoting her rapidly to full professor in 1990, department chair in 1992, and Distinguished Professor in 1995. She was appointed Interim Dean of Education at Iowa State in 1996. At Iowa State she also directed the pre-collegiate programs for talented and gifted students.

Benbow is a Fellow of the American Psychological Association and the American Psychological Society, has received a distinguished scholar award from the National Association for Gifted Children, and in 2004 the Lifetime Achievement Award of the Mensa Education and Research Foundation. In May 2006, she was appointed to the National Mathematics Advisory Panel. She has also served on the National Science Board, which oversees the National Science Foundation.

Benbow has interpreted some of her study data to indicate that there are innate differences between young men and women in their aptitude for higher mathematics and fields of endeavor that depend on mathematics, such as engineering and physical sciences. These positions have been met with some controversy from women's groups.

=== International Society for Intelligence Research ===
Benbow is a longtime member of the International Society for Intelligence Research along with her husband David Lubinski. Both received the Society's Lifetime Achievement Award in 2019.

== Publications ==
Benbow has edited, authored or co-authored 2 books, several book chapters, reviews and over 100 articles in academic journals.

=== Books ===
- Benbow, C. P., & Lubinski, D. (Eds.). (1996). Intellectual talent: Psychometric and social issues. Baltimore, MD: Johns Hopkins University Press.
- Benbow, C. P., & Stanley, J. C. (Eds.). (1983). Academic precocity: Aspects of its development. Baltimore, MD: Johns Hopkins University Press.

=== Selected articles ===
- Lubinski, D.; Benbow, C. P.; Kell, H. J. (2014). "Life Paths and Accomplishments of Mathematically Precocious Males and Females Four Decades Later" (PDF). Psychological Science. 25 (12): 2217–2232. doi:10.1177/0956797614551371. ISSN 0956-7976. PMID 25384550. S2CID 13144084. Archived from the original (PDF) on 2023-08-16.
