= How Much Can We Boost IQ and Scholastic Achievement? =

1969 psychology article by Arthur Jensen

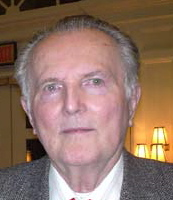
Arthur Jensen

"How Much Can We Boost IQ and Achievement?" is a 1969 article by the American psychologist Arthur Jensen published in the Harvard Educational Review. Controversy over the article led to the coining of the term Jensenism, defined as the theory that IQ is largely determined by genes, including racial heritage. It is among the most controversial in American psychology, and was largely responsible for initiating the current debate over race and intelligence.

The article generated significant attention to, and protests against, Jensen's work.

== Overview ==
Jensen's argument consisted of a series of related claims. IQ tests are valid measurements of a real human ability—what people generally describe as "intelligence"—that is important to many parts of contemporary life. Intelligence, as measured by IQ tests, is about 80 percent heritable. Intelligent parents are much more likely to have intelligent children than other parents. Remedial educational programs have failed to raise the measured intelligence of individuals or groups. Indeed, one of the most inflammatory sentences is the opener: "Compensatory education has been tried and apparently has failed." The article generated extensive discussion and controversy both in the popular press and in the academic literature. The article prompted 29 academic rebuttals, leading the journal to eventually decide to refuse reprints or allow Jensen to respond to critical letters. Some college students also responded to the publication of the paper by burning effigies of Jensen and sending him death threats.

In 1982, Schiff et al. conducted an adoption study that aimed to provide a direct answer to the question Jensen had posted in his 1969 paper. They reported that children who were adopted into families of a higher social class experienced, on average, "an increase of 14 IQ points in the mean IQ score estimated with 2 tests and a reduction by a factor of 4 in the probability of repeating a grade."

Jensen's critics argue that most aspects of his analysis were flawed: IQ tests do not provide a stable or meaningful measure of intelligence; IQ is affected by the environment and not solely or mainly a function of genetics; there is no evidence for genetic differences in racial intelligence; and that the entire topic was too controversial to be productively discussed.

== See also ==
- History of the race and intelligence controversy

== Bibliography ==
- Hunt, Earl; Carlson, Jerry (June 2007). "Considerations Relating to the Study of Group Differences in Intelligence". Perspectives on Psychological Science. 2 (2): 194–213. doi:10.1111/j.1745-6916.2007.00037.x. PMID 26151960. S2CID 32540018.
- Jencks, Christopher; Phillips, Meredith, eds. (25 August 1998). The black-white test score gap. Brookings Institution Press. ISBN 0-8157-4609-1.
  - Alan Wolfe (October 25, 1998). "Affirmative Action: The Fact Gap". The New York Times (Review).
- Jensen, Arthur R. (Spring 1969). "How Much Can We Boost IQ and Scholastic Achievement?". Harvard Educational Review. 39 (1): 1–123. doi:10.17763/haer.39.1.l3u15956627424k7. ISSN 0017-8055. reprinted in Jensen, Arthur (1969). "How Much Can We Boost IQ and Scholastic Achievement?". In Harvard Educational Review (ed.). Environment, Heredity, and Intelligence. Harvard Educational Review Reprint Series. Vol. 2. Cambridge, MA: Harvard Educational Review. pp. 1–123. ISBN 0916690024. LCCN 71087869.
  - "Jensen A R. How much can we boost IQ and scholastic achievement?" (PDF). Citation Classics (Review). No. 41. October 9, 1978.
- Loehlin, John C.; Lindzey, Gardner; Spuhler, J. N. (1975). Race Differences in Intelligence. Books in Psychology. San Francisco: W. H. Freeman. ISBN 978-0-7167-0754-7.
  - R. C. Lewontin (January 1976). "Race differences in intelligence". American Journal of Human Genetics (Review). 28 (1): 92–97. PMC 1684907.
- Tucker, William H. (1996). The Science and Politics of Racial Research. University of Illinois Press. ISBN 978-0-252-06560-6.
