= International Society for Intelligence Research =

Society for researchers in human intelligence

The International Society for Intelligence Research (ISIR) is a scientific society for researchers in human intelligence. It was founded by Douglas K. Detterman of Case Western Reserve University in 2000.

The society advocates for ongoing support for scientific research on cognitive ability, supporting early career researchers, advocating for intelligence, student scholarships, and hosting an annual conference. A 2018 New Statesman article called two editors of Intelligence "eugenicists" and that ISIR conferences have included speakers who are part of "the infiltration of mainstream academia by eugenicists".

Until 2023, Intelligence was the journal of the society. With the advent of additional journals focussed on the topic it has become agnostic to recommending a single journal.

== Presidents ==
The following persons are or have been president of the society:

- 2010 – Douglas K. Detterman
- 2011 – Earl B. Hunt
- 2012 – Linda Gottfredson
- 2013 – David Lubinski
- 2014 – Aljoscha C. Neubauer
- 2015 – Michael A. McDaniel
- 2016 – Richard J. Haier
- 2017 – Timothy Bates
- 2018 – William Revelle
- 2019–2020 – Rex Jung
- 2021–2023 – Rosalind Ardern
- 2024 – Thomas Coyle
