= David Lubinski =

American psychology professor

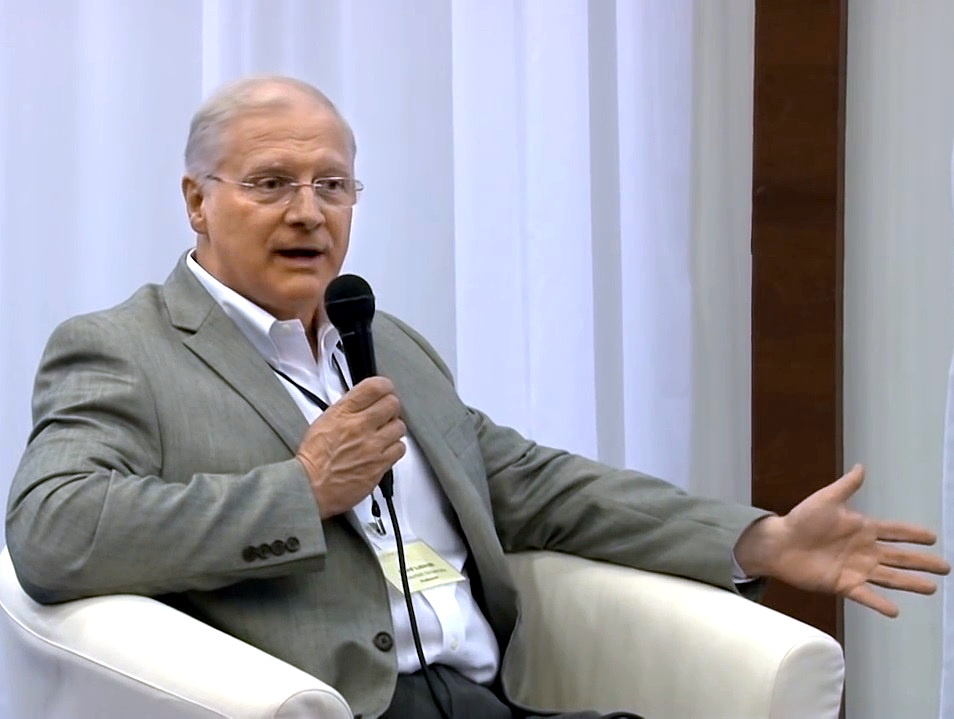
- David Lubinski in 2016
- Born: United States
- Citizenship: United States
- Education: University of Minnesota (BA, PhD)
- Known for: Research on intelligence, Giftedness
- Awards: Distinguished Scientific Award for Early Career Contribution to Psychology (Applied Research/Psychometrics), Association for Gifted Children Distinguished Scholar Award
- Scientific career
- Fields: Psychology
- Workplaces: Vanderbilt University

David J. Lubinski is an American psychology professor known for his work in applied research, psychometrics, and individual differences. His work (with Camilla Benbow) has focussed on exceptionally able children: the nature of exceptional ability, the development of people with exceptional ability (in particular meeting the educational needs of gifted children to maximise their talent). He has published widely on the impact of extremely high ability on outputs such as publications, creative writing and art, patents etc.

Lubinski has argued against the "threshold hypothesis", which suggests (1) that a minimum IQ is needed to achieve a high degree of productivity or creativity and (2) that a higher IQ beyond this threshold does not translate into greater productivity or creativity. Instead, he has argued that higher intelligence leads to higher outcomes with no apparent threshold or dropping off of its impact.

== Education ==
He earned his B.A. and PhD from the University of Minnesota in 1981 and 1987 respectively. He was a Postdoctoral Fellow at University of Illinois at Urbana-Champaign from 1987 to 1990 with Lloyd G. Humphreys. He taught at Iowa State University from 1990 to 1998 and took a position at Vanderbilt University in 1998, where he currently co-directs the Study of Mathematically Precocious Youth (SMPY), a longitudinal study of intellectual talent, with Camilla Benbow.

In 1994, he was one of 52 signatories on "Mainstream Science on Intelligence", an editorial written by Linda Gottfredson and published in The Wall Street Journal, which declared the consensus of the signing scholars on issues related to intelligence research following the publication of the book The Bell Curve.

In 1996, he won the American Psychological Association Distinguished Scientific Award for Early Career Contribution to Psychology (Applied Research/Psychometrics). In 2006, he received the Distinguished Scholar Award from the National Association for Gifted Children (NAGC). In addition to this, his work has earned several Mensa Awards for Research Excellence and the organisations Lifetime Achievement Award. He is an APA Division 1 Fellow. He has edited a book with Camilla Benbow, and another with Rene V. Dawis, and has published over 50 refereed journal articles.

=== International Society for Intelligence Research ===
Lubinski is a longtime member of the International Society for Intelligence Research along with his wife Camilla Benbow. Both received the Society's Lifetime Achievement Award in 2019.

== Published works ==
=== Selected articles ===
- Lubinski, D.; Benbow, C.P.; Kell, H.J. (2014). "Life paths and accomplishments of mathematically precocious males and females four decades later" (PDF). Psychological Science. 25 (12): 2217–2232. doi:10.1177/0956797614551371. PMID 25384550. S2CID 13144084. Archived from the original (PDF) on March 5, 2019.
- Lubinski, D.; Benbow, C. P. (2006). "Study of Mathematically Precocious Youth (SMPY) after 35 years: Uncovering antecedents for the development of math-science expertise". Perspectives on Psychological Science. 1 (4): 316–343. doi:10.1111/j.1745-6916.2006.00019.x. PMID 26151798. S2CID 1739884.
- Lubinski, D.; Benbow, C. P.; Webb, R. M.; Bleske-Rechek, A. (2006). "Tracking exceptional human capital over two decades" (PDF). Psychological Science. 17 (3): 194–199. doi:10.1111/j.1467-9280.2006.01685.x. PMID 16507058. S2CID 1314771.

=== Books (edited) ===
- Benbow CP, Lubinski, D. J. (Eds.) (1996). Intellectual talent: Psychometric and social issues. Johns Hopkins University Press. ISBN 0-8018-5302-8
- Lubinski DJ, Dawis, R. V. (Eds.) (1995). Assessing individual differences in human behavior: methods, concepts, and findings. Palo Alto, CA: Consulting Psychologists Press. ISBN 0-89106-072-3
