= Intelligence (journal) =

- Discipline: Intelligence, psychometrics
- Language: English
- Edited by: Dragoș Iliescu and Samuel Greiff

Publication details
- History: 1977–present
- Publisher: Elsevier
- Frequency: Bimonthly
- Impact factor: 2.8 (2024)

Standard abbreviations
- ISO 4: Intelligence

Indexing
- CODEN: NTLLDT
- ISSN: 0160-2896
- LCCN: 77643155
- OCLC no.: 03334510

Links
- Journal homepage; Online access

Intelligence is a bimonthly peer-reviewed academic journal of psychology that covers research on intelligence and psychometrics. It is published by Elsevier and is the official journal of the International Society for Intelligence Research. The journal was established in 1977 by Douglas K. Detterman. The editors-in-chief are Dragoș Iliescu and Samuel Greiff.

According to the New Statesman in 2018, the "journal Intelligence is one of the most respected in its field" but has allowed its reputation "to be used to launder or legitimate racist pseudo-science". Smithsonian Magazine called it "a more respected psychology journal", but stated that it has "occasionally included papers with pseudoscientific findings about intelligence differences between races". It has been criticized for having included on its editorial board biochemist Gerhard Meisenberg and psychologist Richard Lynn, both known as promoters of eugenics and scientific racism. In 2018 then-editor-in-chief Richard J. Haier defended their involvement on the basis of academic freedom.

== History ==
The first issue of the journal was published in January 1977, with Douglas K. Detterman of Case Western Reserve University as editor-in-chief. In 2016, Detterman was replaced by Richard J. Haier.

In August 2024, Elsevier began a review of work published in its journals, including Intelligence and Personality and Individual Differences, written by Richard Lynn. This review coincided with renewed attention towards scientific racism in academia, and specifically calls for much of Lynn's work to be retracted.

In early 2025, Haier was replaced as editor-in-chief by Dragoș Iliescu and Samuel Greiff.

== Abstracting and indexing ==
The journal is abstracted and indexed in Psychological Abstracts/PsycINFO, Child Development Abstracts and Bibliography, Current Index to Journals in Education, Scopus, and Sociological Abstracts. According to the Journal Citation Reports, its 2024 impact factor was 2.8.
