= Richard J. Haier =

American psychologist

- Education: University at Buffalo (BA); Johns Hopkins University (PhD)
- Scientific career
- Fields: Psychology, psychometrics
- Workplaces: University of California, Irvine

Richard J. Haier is an American psychologist who has researched a neural basis for human intelligence, psychometrics, general intelligence, and sex and intelligence.

Haier is a professor emeritus in the Pediatric Neurology Division of the School of Medicine at the University of California, Irvine. He received a Ph.D. from Johns Hopkins University in 1975, and was the editor-in-chief of the journal Intelligence between 2016 and 2024.

== Selected bibliography ==
=== Books ===
- Haier, Richard J. (2016-12-28). The Neuroscience of Intelligence. Cambridge Fundamentals of Neuroscience in Psychology. New York: Cambridge University Press. ISBN 978-1107461437. OCLC 951742581.
- Haier, Richard J.; Barbey, Aron; Karama, Sherif, eds. (2021). The Cambridge Handbook of Intelligence & Cognitive Neuroscience. Cambridge University Press. ISBN 978-1108480543.
- Haier, Richard J.; Colom, Roberto; Hunt, Earl (2024). The Science of Human Intelligence. Cambridge University Press. ISBN 978-1108701969.

=== Journal articles ===
- Haier RJ, White NS, Alkire MT (2003). "Individual differences in general intelligence correlate to brain function during non- reasoning tasks". Intelligence. 31 (5): 429–441. doi:10.1016/s0160-2896(03)00025-4.
- Head E, Lott IT, Hof PR, Su JH, Kim R, Haier RJ, Cotman CW (2003). "Parallel Compensatory and Pathological Events Associated with Tau Pathology in Middle Aged Individuals with Down Syndrome". Journal of Neuropathology and Experimental Neurology. 62 (9): 917–926. doi:10.1093/jnen/62.9.917. PMID 14533781.
- White NS, Alkire MT, Haier RJ (2003). "A voxel-based morphometric study of non-demented adults with Down syndrome". NeuroImage. 20 (1): 393–403. doi:10.1016/s1053-8119(03)00273-8. PMID 14527599. S2CID 1381843.
- Haier RJ, Alkire MT, White NS, Uncapher M, Lott IT, Head E, Cotman CW (2003). "Temporal cortex hyper-metabolism in Down syndrome prior to the onset of dementia". Neurology. 61 (12): 1673–1679. doi:10.1212/01.wnl.0000098935.36984.25. PMID 14694028. S2CID 11526800.
- Alkire MT, White NS, Hsieh R, Haier RJ (2004). "Functional MRI brain mapping of painful throbbing 5-Hz electrical stimulus intensity responses". Anesthesiology. 100 (4): 939–946. doi:10.1097/00000542-200404000-00026. PMID 15087631. S2CID 38343563.
