= Moisés Salinas =

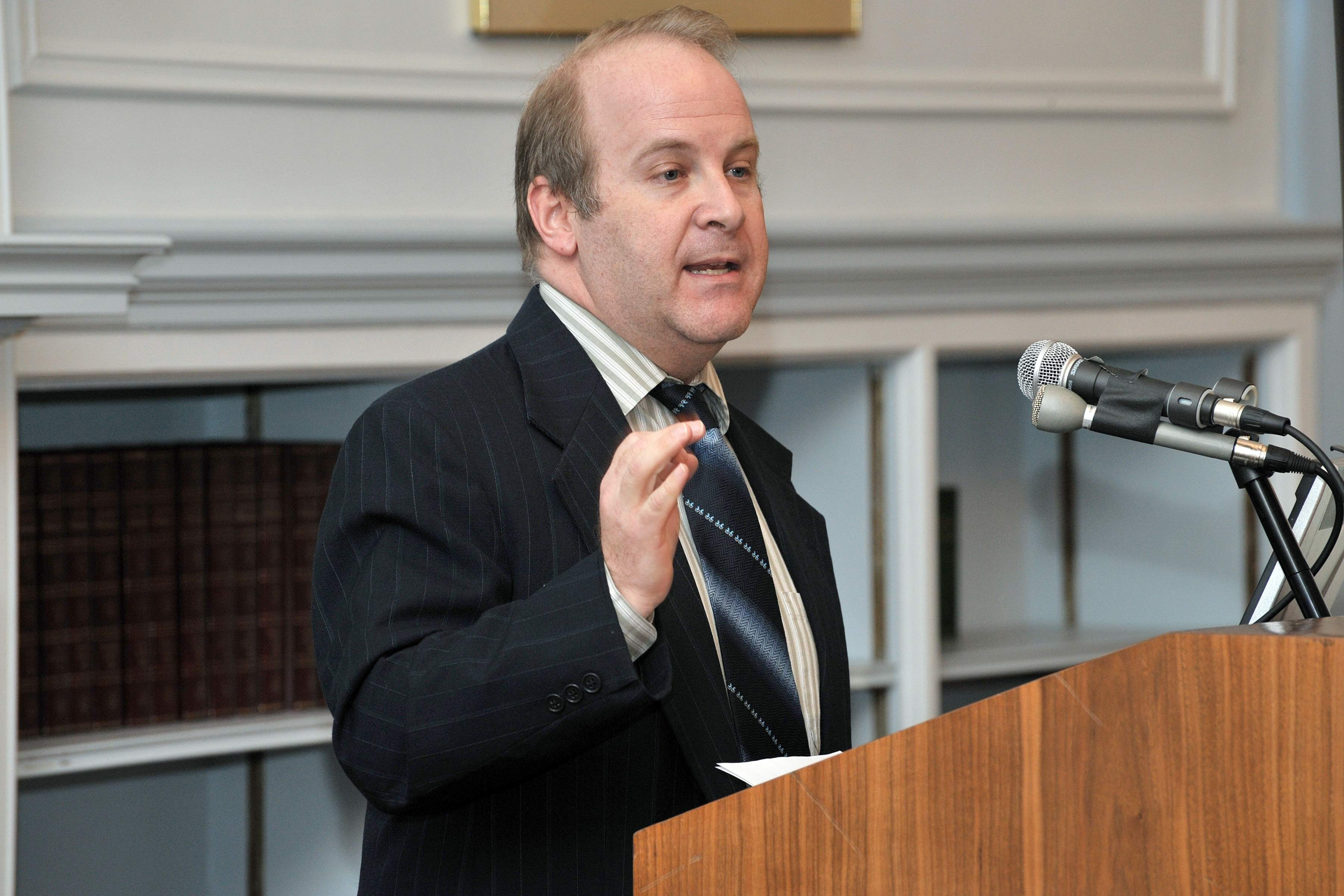
Moisés Salinas Fleitman

Moisés Salinas Fleitman (Hebrew: מויסס סלינס פלייטמן) is a Mexican American scholar of developmental and social psychology, a multi-cultural educator, a Peacebuilder and Zionist political activist Former Chief diversity officer at Central Connecticut State University and Rector (academia) at ORT University Mexico. Currently he serves as Executive Director of Remember Us The Holocaust.

== Early life ==
Born in Mexico City, Mexico in 1966, Salinas was involved in Zionist activities from age 15 when he attended the Aluma Institute for Jewish Education, which was a program in Jewish education and leadership. He then served as a youth councilor in the Dor Hadash Zionist Organization in Mexico City. Later (1985-6), he served as Secretary General of the movement that had about 150 members, and designed educational activities for youth aged 10–18.

Salinas first came to Israel in 1984-5 when he attended the Machon L'Madrichei Chutz La'Aretz, the Institute for Youth Leaders Abroad in Jerusalem, which was a program in Zionist leadership and education. He returned to Israel in 1986 to study at the Hebrew University of Jerusalem, earning his BA in Educational Psychology in 1991. While studying, he was an active participant of the Peace Now (Hebrew: שלום עכשיו) movement and a member of the Mapam party student wing.

== Political activities ==
Salinas moved to Israel in 1986. In 1988, he became the youngest board member of the Magshimim Federation, and he coordinated several programs for the Jewish Agency Youth and Hechalutz department for Latin America. In 2004, Salinas became one of 14 young Zionist leaders worldwide to be honored with the first Herzl Awards from the World Zionist Organization for his contributions to the Zionist movement. In about 2003, Salinas founded the Hartford chapter of the American Zionist Movement. He was profiled in the Jewish Ledger and selected as one of Connecticut's Jewish Movers and Shakers in 2005. He served as a board member of the national American Zionist federation, as well as a board member of Meretz USA and the Jewish Academic Network for Israeli-Palestinian Peace. He served as president of Meretz USA/Partners for Progressive Israel in 2010.

== Academic activities ==
Salinas completed his Ph.D. in educational psychology at the University of Texas in Austin. He most recently served as associate professor of developmental and social psychology at Central Connecticut State University. He has published in a variety of publications, including the Journal of Black Psychology and Computers and Education. He has co-authored papers with psychologists Claude Steele, Joshua Aronson, and Richard Valencia. He has received awards from the American Education Research Association Grant in 2003, from the Carnegie Academy for the Scholarship of Teaching and Learning award in 2002, and a The Pew Charitable Trusts Teaching Leadership Award in 1997. In 2008 he was named Chief Diversity Officer at CCSU.

In 2011, Salinas left CCSU and became Academic Dean at Hebraica University in Mexico City in August 2011. In 2015, he was named Rector (academia) at ORT University Mexico, the first institution in Latin America focused on Social Responsibility, Entrepreneurship and Leadership. In 2026, he became Executive Director of Remember Us The Holocaust, an educational organization dedicated to preserving Holocaust memory and using its lessons to confront hatred, antisemitism, prejudice, and discrimination in all their forms.

== Selected publications ==
=== Books ===
- Salinas, M.F., & Salinas, J.I. (2013). Tu hijo en el centro: Una nueva visión educativa para la era digital [Your child at the center: a new educational vision for the digital era]. Mexico, D.F.: Random House. ISBN 978-6-07311-369-4
- Salinas, M.F. & Abu-Rabi (Eds.) (2010), Resolving the Israeli-Palestinian Conflict: Perspectives on the Peace Process. Amherst, NY: Cambria Press. ISBN 978-1-60497-654-0
- Salinas, M.F. (2007). Planting hatred, sowing pain: the psychology of the Israeli Palestinian conflict. Westport, CT: Greenwood/Praeger. ISBN 0-275-99005-2
- Salinas, M.F. (2003). The politics of stereotype: Affirmative action and psychology. Westport, CT: Greenwood/Praeger. ISBN 0-313-32396-8
- Valencia, R. R., & Salinas, M. F. (2003). Cultural bias in intelligence tests: Is it a closed issue? In R. R. Valencia and L. Suzuki (Eds.), Intelligence Testing and Minority Students. New York: Sage Publications.
- Aronson, J., Steele, C. M., Salinas, M. F., & Lustina, M. J. (2003). The effect of stereotype threat on the standardized test performance of college students. In E. Aronson (Ed.), Readings About the Social Animal. (8th ed., pp. 415–430). New York: Worth Publishers.

=== Other publications ===
- Aronson, J., Steele, C.M., Salinas, M.F., & Lustina, M.J. (2003). The effect of stereotype threat on the standardized test performance of college students. In E. Aronson (Ed.) Readings About the Social Animal. (9th ed., pp. 415–430). New York: Worth Publishers.
- Salinas, M. F. (2005). Attitudes. In N. J. Salkind (Ed.), The Encyclopedia of Human Development, Vol. 1. Thousand Oaks, CA: Sage
- Salinas, M. F., & Kane, S. E. (2005). Achievement, Long Term Learning and Lerner-Centered instruction in Higher Education. In P. Lemma (Ed.), Effective teaching: Systematic Reflections on the scholarship of teaching, 2. New Britain, CT: CCSU.Adam, M. (2004). Re-Acculturating Racial Stereotypes. Education Digest, 70(1), 38-42.
- Salinas, M.F.,(2006). From Dewey to Gates: A model to integrate pedagogical principles in the selection and use of instructional technology. Computers and Education.
- Valencia, R.R, Villareal, B. & Salinas, M.F. (2002). Cultural bias in intelligence testing for Mexican Americans. In R. R. Valencia (Ed.) Chicano School Failure and Success, 2nd ed.. London: Falmer Press.
- Valencia, R.R. & Salinas, M.F. (2000). Test Bias. In R. R. Valencia and L. Suzuki,(Eds.) Intelligence Testing and Minority Students. New York: Sage Publications.
- Salinas, M.F. (1998). Stereotype threat: The role of effort withdrawal and apprehension on the intellectual underperformance of Mexican-Americans. Dissertation Abstracts International, 59 (06), 1908A. (University Microfilms No. AAT98-38106)
- Davis, C., Aronson, J. & Salinas, M.F. (2006). Black racial identity as a moderator of stereotype threat: Identity in context. Journal of Black Psychology, 32, 4. 399-418.
