= Sex differences in intelligence =

Area of scientific research

Sex differences in human intelligence have long been a topic of debate among researchers and scholars. It is now recognized that there are no significant sex differences in average IQ, though average performance in certain cognitive tasks varies somewhat between sexes.

While some test batteries show slightly greater intelligence in males, others show slightly greater intelligence in females. In particular, studies have shown female subjects performing better on tasks related to verbal ability, and males performing better on tasks related to rotation of objects in space, often categorized as spatial ability.

Some research indicates that male advantages on some cognitive tests are minimized when controlling for socioeconomic factors. It has also been hypothesized that there is slightly higher variability in male scores in certain areas compared to female scores, leading to males' being over-represented at the top and bottom extremes of the distribution, though the evidence for this hypothesis is inconclusive.

== IQ research ==
=== Background ===
There is no statistically significant difference between the average IQ scores of men and women. Average differences have been reported, however, on some tests of mathematics and verbal ability in certain contexts. Some studies have suggested that there may be more variability in cognitive ability among males than among females, but others have contradicted this, or presented evidence that differential variability is culturally rather than biologically determined. Some studies have even found that females are the more variable sex depending on which country the population being sampled is from. According to psychologist Diane Halpern, "there are both differences and similarities in the cognitive abilities of women and men, but there is no data-based rationale to support the idea that either is the smarter or superior sex."

=== Findings ===
Although most tests show no sex difference, there are some that do. For example, it has been found that female subjects tend to perform better on tests of verbal abilities and processing speed while males tend to perform better on tests of visual-spatial ability and crystallized intelligence. For verbal fluency, females have been specifically found to perform slightly better, on average, in vocabulary and reading comprehension and significantly higher in speech production and essay writing. Males have been specifically found to perform better, on average, in spatial visualization, spatial perception, and mental rotation. None of these findings, however, suggest an advantage for either sex in general intelligence, nor in fluid intelligence.

Most studies find either a very small difference or no sex difference with regard to general intelligence. In 2000, researchers Roberto Colom and Francisco J. Abad conducted a large study of 10,475 adults on five IQ tests taken from the Primary Mental Abilities and found negligible or no significant sex differences. The tests conducted were on vocabulary, spatial rotation, verbal fluency and inductive reasoning.

The literature on sex differences in intelligence has produced inconsistent results due to the type of testing used, and this has resulted in debate among researchers. Garcia (2002) argues that there might be a small insignificant sex difference in intelligence in general (IQ) but this may not necessarily reflect a sex difference in general intelligence or g factor. Although most researchers distinguish between g and IQ, those that argued for greater male intelligence asserted that IQ and g are synonymous (Lynn & Irwing 2004) and so the real division comes from defining IQ in relation to g factor. In 2008, Lynn and Irwing proposed that since working memory ability correlates highest with g factor, researchers would have no choice but to accept greater male intelligence if differences on working memory tasks are found. As a result, a neuroimaging study published by Schmidt (2009) conducted an investigation into this proposal by measuring sex differences on an n-back working memory task. The results found no sex difference in working memory capacity, thus contradicting the position put forward by Lynn and Irwing (2008) and more in line with those arguing for no sex differences in intelligence.

A 2012 review by researchers Richard E. Nisbett, Joshua Aronson, Clancy Blair, William Dickens, James Flynn, Diane F. Halpern and Eric Turkheimer discussed Arthur Jensen's 1998 studies on sex differences in intelligence. Jensen's tests were significantly g-loaded but were not set up to get rid of any sex differences (read differential item functioning). They summarized his conclusions finding "No evidence was found for sex differences in the mean level of g or in the variability of g. Males, on average, excel on some factors; females on others." Jensen's conclusion that no overall sex differences existed for g has been reinforced by researchers who analyzed this issue with a battery of 42 mental ability tests among adults and found no sex difference.

A large analysis by five researchers with a representative sample size of over 15,000 participants found no support for sex differences in IQ, neither among children nor among adults.

A 2022 meta-analysis found that even small sex-based differences in general intelligence among school-aged children were an artifact of older tests, with current test batteries showing no statistically significant difference between the sexes, but that differences in intelligence sub-types such as processing speed (favoring females) and visual-spatial reasoning (favoring males) remained even when controlling for test age. They concluded that their analysis confirmed previous findings where "no evidence was found for gender differences in the mean level of g or in the variability of g."

=== Variability ===
Some studies have identified the degree of IQ variance as a difference between males and females. Some researchers have argued that males tend to show greater variability on many traits, a view which is termed the variability hypothesis; for example, having both highest and lowest scores on tests of cognitive abilities. Other research has been published which contradicts this hypothesis, however, showing either equal variability between the sexes in some cultural contexts or else greater representation of females at the upper extreme of some measures of cognitive ability.

Feingold (1992) and Hedges and Nowell (1995) reported that, despite average sex differences being small and relatively stable over time, test score variances of males were generally larger than those of females. Feingold "found that males were more variable than females on tests of quantitative reasoning, spatial visualisation, spelling, and general knowledge. ... Hedges and Nowell go one step further and demonstrate that, with the exception of performance on tests of reading comprehension, perceptual speed, and associative memory, more males than females were observed among high-scoring individuals."

In regards to variability in mathematics performance, a meta-analysis by Lindberg et al. (2010) found male-to-female variance ratios ranged from 0.88 to 1.34 across studies with an average of 1.07, indicating nearly equivalent male and female variances. The authors note that greater male variability is not ubiquitous, and ratios less than 1.0 have been reported in some national and international data sets. A review by Hyde et al. (2009) also evaluated the topic of greater male variability in mathematics performance. The review found that the gender gap among the highest performers has narrowed over time in the U.S., is not found among some ethnic groups and in some nations, and correlates with several measures of gender inequality. The authors conclude that greater male variability in math performance is largely an artifact of cultural factors as opposed to innate biological sex differences.

== Brain and intelligence ==
Differences in brain physiology between sexes do not necessarily relate to differences in intellect. Although men have larger brains, men and women have equal IQs. For men, the gray matter volume in the frontal and parietal lobes correlates with IQ; for women, the gray matter volume in the frontal lobe and Broca's area (which is used in language processing) correlates with IQ. Women have greater cortical thickness, cortical complexity and cortical surface area (controlling for body size) which compensates for smaller brain size. Meta-analysis and studies have found that brain size explains 6% of variance among individual intelligence and cortical thickness explains 5%.

Although a meta-analysis of 148 samples from over 8000 participants reported a weak correlation between brain size and IQ, men and women did not differ in IQ, and the researchers concluded that "it is not warranted to interpret brain size as an isomorphic proxy of human intelligence differences." Brain volume contributes little to IQ test performance. Outside of comparing intelligence levels of the sexes, brain size is only one of numerous factors that influence intelligence, alongside white matter integrity, overall developmental stability, parieto-frontal neuronal networks, neuronal efficiency, and cortical gyrification. Brain structural integrity seems to be more important as a biological basis.

In 2021, Lise Eliot et al found no difference in overall male/female abilities in verbal, spatial or emotion processing.

== Mathematics performance ==
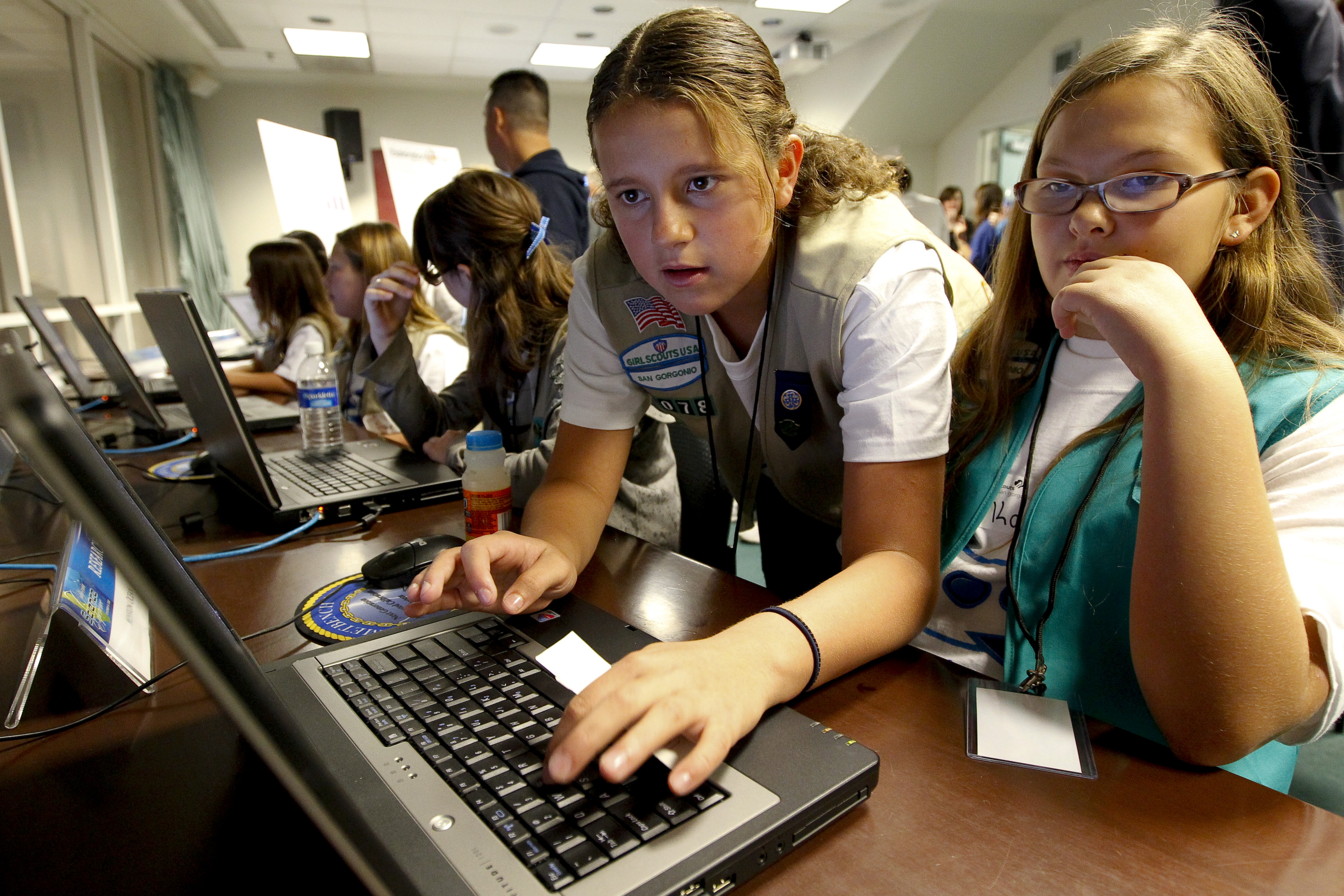
Girl scouts compete in the USS California Science Experience at Naval Surface Warfare Center Corona Division.

Across countries, males have performed better on mathematics tests than females, but there is the possibility male-female difference in math scores is related to gender inequality in social roles. Some psychologists believe that many historical and current sex differences in mathematics performance may be related to boys' higher likelihood of receiving math encouragement than girls. Parents were, and sometimes still are, more likely to consider a son's mathematical achievement as being a natural skill while a daughter's mathematical achievement is more likely to be seen as something she studied hard for. This difference in attitude may discourage girls and women from further involvement in mathematics-related subjects and careers.

In a 2008 study paid for by the National Science Foundation in the United States, researchers found that girls perform as well as boys on standardized math tests. They attributed this to girls now taking as many advanced math courses as boys, unlike in the past.

There is also evidence that boys are over-represented among the very best and very worst performers on measures of mathematical ability and standardized measures of IQ. Some research suggests that differences in mathematics course performance measures favor females. A small performance difference in mathematics on the SAT persists in favor of males, though the gap has shrunk from 40 points (5.0%) in 1975 to 18 points (2.3%) in 2020. The international PISA exam provides representative samples. On the 2018 math PISA, there was no statistically significant difference between the performances of girls and boys in 39.5% of the 76 countries that participated. Meanwhile, boys outperformed girls in 32 countries (42.1%), while girls outperformed boys in 14 (18.4%). On average, boys performed 5 points (1%) higher than girls. However, overall, the gender gap in math and science for boys and girls from similar socio-economic backgrounds was not significant.

On the math portion of the 2019 TIMMS, taken at a similar age as the PISA, girls outperformed boys by 3 points on average, although the difference was not statistically significant. A meta-analysis of nearly half a million participants using data from both the TIMMS and the PISA found that differences were negligible, although girls outperformed boys in some countries and the opposite occurred in others.

A 2008 meta-analysis published in Science using data from over 7 million students found no statistically significant differences between the mathematical capabilities of males and females. A 2011 meta-analysis with 242 studies from 1990 to 2007 involving 1,286,350 people found no overall sex difference of performance in mathematics. The meta-analysis also found that although there were no overall differences, a small sex difference that favored males in complex problem solving was still present in high school. However, the authors note that boys continue to take more physics courses than girls, which train complex solving abilities and may provide stronger training than pure mathematics.

The mathematics GCSE examination results in England have often been inconsistent about which sex performed better. In 2008, 14.7% of females scored an A or above, while only 13.9% of males did the same. But in 2024, only 15.5% of females scored an A or above, while 18% of males did. A 2020 analysis of gender differences in the mathematical abilities of 13 million students in Italy found that males performed better at mathematics and that this difference appeared to increase the richer the Italian regions were, which is also characterized by greater gender equality.

One line of inquiry has focused on the role that stereotype threat might play in mathematics performance differences between male and female test-takers. Systematic reviews and meta-analyses suggest that stereotype threat is implicated in performance differences on some mathematics tests, though the effect appears to vary considerably in different social contexts and for different test conditions.

== Reading and verbal skills ==
Studies have shown a female advantage in reading and verbal skills. On the international PISA reading exam, girls consistently outperform boys across all countries, and all differences are statistically significant. In the most recent PISA exam (2018), girls outperformed boys by almost 30 points. On average in OECD countries, 28% of boys did not obtain a reading proficiency level of 2.

Studies have shown that girls spend more time reading than boys and read more for fun, likely contributing to the gap. Some psychologists believe that many historical and current sex differences in mathematics performance may be related to girls' higher likelihood of receiving reading encouragement than boys. Parents were, and sometimes still are, more likely to consider a daughter's reading achievement as being a natural skill while a son's reading achievement is more likely to be seen as something he studied hard for.

== Spatial ability ==
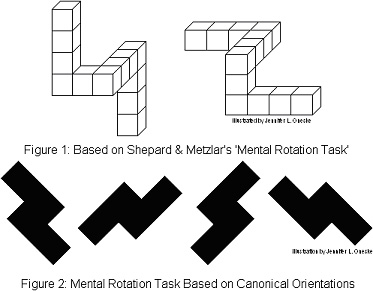
Examples of figures from mental rotation tests

Meta-studies show a male advantage in mental rotation, assessing horizontality and verticality, and a male advantage for most aspects of spatial memory. Women have an advantage for certain components of spatial memory. Whereas men show a selective advantage for fine-grained metric positional reconstruction, where absolute spatial coordinates are emphasized, women show an advantage in spatial location memory, which is the ability to accurately remember relative object positions (where objects are); however, the advantage in spatial location memory is small and inconsistent across studies.

A proposed evolutionary hypothesis is that men and women evolved different mental abilities to adapt to their different roles, including labor-based roles, in society. For example, "ancestral women more often foraged for fruits, vegetables, and roots over large geographic regions." The labor-based role explanation suggests that men may have evolved greater spatial abilities as a result of behaviors such as navigating during a hunt.

Sex differences in mental rotation and judgement of line angles in favor of males have been observed across multiple nations, lending credence to biological origins. Countries with greater gender equality also had greater gaps in these areas.

Results from studies conducted in the physical environment are not conclusive about sex differences. Various studies on the same task show no differences. There are studies that show no difference in finding one's way between two places.

Performance in mental rotation and similar spatial tasks is affected by gender expectations. For example, studies show that being told before the test that men typically perform better, or that the task is linked with jobs like aviation engineering typically associated with men versus jobs like fashion design typically associated with women, will negatively affect female performance on spatial rotation and positively influence it when subjects are told the opposite.

Playing computer or video games increases mental rotation ability, especially for females. Playing action video games in particular benefits spatial abilities in females more than in males, up to a point where sex differences in spatial attention are eliminated. Gender generally has an influence on preference of game genre. Action video games such as first-person shooters, adventure games, and sports games are generally preferred by male players, while female players tend to prefer games such as puzzle, card, and platform games.

The possibility of testosterone and other androgens as a cause of sex differences in psychology has been a subject of study, but results have been mixed. A meta-analysis of women who were exposed to unusually high levels of androgens in the womb due to congenital adrenal hyperplasia concluded that there is no evidence of enhanced spatial ability among these individuals. The meta-analysis speculates that average sex differences in some spatial tasks could be partially explained by androgen exposure at a different time of the life span, such as during mini-puberty, or by the different socialization males and females experience. In addition, a meta-analysis showed that, although female-to-male transgender individuals who received testosterone therapy did improve their spatial abilities, male-to-female transgender individuals who took androgen-suppressants also showed an improvement or no deterioration of spatial skills.

== Sex differences in academics ==
A 2014 meta-analysis published in the journal Psychological Bulletin found females outperformed males in teacher-assigned school marks throughout all levels of education. The meta-analysis found that the magnitude of higher female performance remained consistent across the period analysed, which included studies published between 1914 and 2011.

A 2015 study by researchers Gijsbert Stoet and David C. Geary from the journal of Intelligence reported that girl's overall education achievement is better in 70 percent of all the 47–75 countries that participated in PISA. The study consisting of 1.5 million 15-year-olds found higher overall female achievement across reading, mathematics, and science literacy and better performance across 70% of participating countries, including many with considerable gaps in economic and political equality, and they fell behind in only 4% of countries. Stoet et al. said sex differences in educational achievement are not reliably linked to gender equality.

However, there is some evidence that there is bias in teacher grading against males, although evidence for this is not fully conclusive. Similarly, other studies show bias against females, especially in mathematics and science. According to a global report performed by the OECD of over 60 countries, girls were given higher marks in comparison to boys with the same ability.

== Historical perspectives ==
Prior to the 20th century, it was a commonly held view that men were intellectually superior to women. Early brain studies comparing mass and volumes between the sexes suggested that women were intellectually inferior because they have smaller and lighter brains. Writer Helen H. Gardener publicly disputed this idea with William A. Hammond, former Surgeon General of the United States Army.

In the 19th century, whether men and women had equal intelligence was seen by many as a prerequisite for the granting of suffrage. Leta Hollingworth argued that women were not permitted to realize their full potential, as they were confined to the roles of child-rearing and housekeeping.

During the early 20th century, the scientific consensus shifted to the view that sex plays no role in intelligence.

In his 1916 study of children's IQs, psychologist Lewis Terman concluded that "the intelligence of girls, at least up to 14 years, does not differ materially from that of boys". He did, however, find "rather marked" differences on a minority of tests. For example, he found boys were "decidedly better" in arithmetical reasoning, while girls were "superior" at answering comprehension questions. He also proposed that discrimination, lack of opportunity, women's responsibilities in motherhood, or emotional factors may have accounted for the fact that few women had careers in intellectual fields.

== See also ==
- Sex differences in emotional intelligence
- Sex differences in humans
- Emotional intelligence
- Sex differences in psychology
- Heritability of IQ
