= David Yaari =

American-Israeli entrepreneur

- דוד יערי
- Born: 1969 (age 56–57); United States
- Education: Yeshiva University; New York University
- Title: Chairman of the World Confederation of United Zionists

David Yaari (Hebrew: דוד יערי; born David Borowich in 1969) is an American - Israeli entrepreneur, philanthropist, community organizer and activist. He is the Founding Director General of the Arizona-Israel Trade and Investment Office. He is also the chairman of the World Confederation of United Zionists (Kol Israel) and sits on the board of Keren Kayemet LeYisrael (KKL) - Jewish National Fund (JNF). He currently serves on the Board of Directors of StellarNova, an education technology company focused on STEM and on numerous philanthropic boards. In 2008, The Jewish Daily Forward included him in the "Forward 50", a list of the year's 50 most influential Jewish Americans.

== Professional life ==
In late 2019, following an announcement from Governor Doug Ducey and the Arizona Commerce Authority, Yaari launched the first Arizona-Israel Trade and Investment Office, where he serves as Director General.

== Community and Civic Life ==
Yaari has been active with several philanthropic organizations, including many which he founded. In 2007, he founded and Chaired the Council of Young Jewish Presidents.

For Israel's 60th anniversary in 2008, David conceived of and chaired the official New York celebration at Radio City Music Hall and was selected as the Grand Marshall of the 2008 Salute to Israel Parade.

Upon arriving in Israel, he was appointed as the CEO of Hillel Israel, the Israeli affiliate of Hillel International.

The Jewish Daily Forward ranked him one of the 50 most influential Jewish Americans in 2008.

== Political life ==
In 2004, he was part of a dedicated team to work in Florida to help re-elect President George W. Bush and during that time served on the Knesset’s international committee to develop an Israeli Constitution.

In 2017, Yaari arranged a briefing on the state of AntiSemitism at the Israeli Knesset.

== Personal life ==
In 2008, Yaari married Sivan, the founder of Innovation: Africa. In 2009 the couple moved to Israel and since 2011, they live in Herzliya with their three children.

== Recognition ==
- Herzl Prize, 2004
