= Sivan Yaari =

Israeli social entrepreneur

- סיון יערי
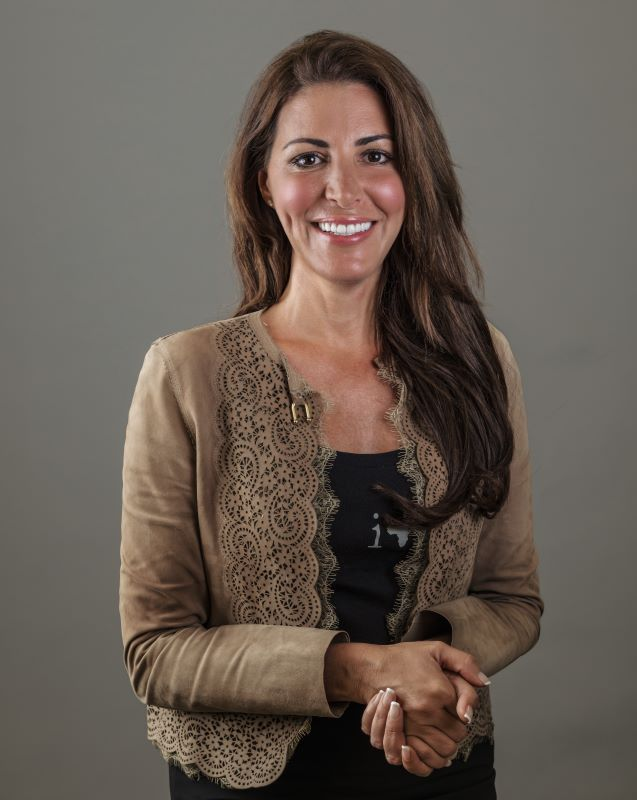
- Sivan Yaari in 2016
- Born: June 23, 1978 (age 48)
- Education: Pace University; Columbia University
- Title: Founder and CEO of Innovation: Africa

Sivan Yaari (Hebrew: סיון יערי; born June 23, 1978) is an Israeli businessperson who founded Innovation: Africa and serves as its Founder & CEO.

== Early life and education ==
Yaari was born in Israel, raised in France and educated in the United States. She received a bachelor's degree in finance from Pace University and a master's degree in international Energy management and policy from Columbia University.

== Innovation: Africa ==
In 2008, Yaari founded Innovation: Africa a nonprofit organization that brings innovative Israeli solar, water and agricultural technologies to rural villages throughout Africa. The organization has completed over 1400 projects in remote villages, providing electricity and clean water to more than 6 million people across 10 African countries.

Innovation: Africa maintains headquarters in both New York and Herzliya Pituah.

== Recognition ==
Sivan and her organization, Innovation: Africa, have received multiple awards for their work.

Since 2012, Innovation: Africa has had a special consultative status to the United Nations Economic and Social Council (ECOSOC). Thanks to Innovation: Africa's transparent and live monitoring of its projects, it was granted the United Nations Innovation Award.

Yaari received the "Light of Israel Award" from the Israeli Ministry of Foreign Affairs and has been recognized as one of the most "Inspiring Israeli this Decade" by Grapevine; one of the “50 Most Influential Women in Israel” by Forbes; one of the "Top 10 Most Influential Israelis in International Business, science, and Culture” by NoCamels and one of the “Top 100 People Positively Influencing Jewish Life” by Algemeiner Journal;

She was selected to light a torch at the celebration of Israel's 75th Independence Day in 2023.

In 2023, Yaari was listed as one of the world's top 50 most influential Jews by the Jerusalem Post.

In recognition of her work across rural Africa, in 2024 Sivan was awarded the Bertie Lubner Humanitarian Award by the South Africa Jewish Report magazine.

In 2026, Yaari was named a YPO Global Impact Award Honoree by Young Presidents' Organization (YPO) in recognition of her leadership and impact across more than 1,400 villages and 6 million people in Africa.

In October 2026, Yaari was awarded an honorary doctorate by Bar-Ilan Univeristy during its 70th anniversary gala, alongside fellow recipients Gal Gadot, Steve Witkoff, Berel Lazar and Sandy Frankel.

== Personal life ==
Yaari resides in Herzliya with her husband David Yaari (Borowich) and their three children.
