= Herzl Award (WZO) =

- Awarded for: Exceptional efforts on behalf of Israel and the Zionist cause
- Country: Israel
- Presented by: World Zionist Organization
- First award: 2004; 22 years ago

The Herzl Award is awarded annually by the Department for Zionist Activities of the World Zionist Organization (WZO) to outstanding young men and women in recognition of their exceptional efforts on behalf of Israel and the Zionist cause. The award was first awarded in 1954 to Winston Churchill, on the semicentennial anniversary of Theodore Herzl's death.

== Background ==
Herzl was the father of political Zionism. Even though he died at the young age of 44, of which only 9 were dedicated to the Zionist cause, he was able to mobilize the forces and create the infrastructure that would revolutionize the Jewish world and bring about the realization of the Jewish people's age-old dream of returning to Zion.

== Award requirements ==
According to the site of the WZO, candidates are nominated by Zionist Federations around the world for achievement in one or more of several fields:

- Encouraging aliyah
- Promoting Zionist education (formal or informal)
- Fostering the study of Hebrew
- Advocating on behalf of Israel
- Furthering the development of Israel as an exemplary society
- Contributing to the advancement of Zionist thought
- Organizing on behalf of the Zionist movement

Nominees must be no older than 44, Herzl's age at the time of his death.

== Recipients ==
All Herzl Award recipients receive a distinctive certificate and an engraved cast bronze trophy, as well as being inscribed in a special Herzl album in Jerusalem.

Year	Recipients
2004	(Argentina) Susana Edith Gelber
2004	(Australia) Ron Weiser
2004	(Belgium) Francis Weitz
2004	(Denmark) Simon Boysen
2004	(Hungary) Attila Novak
2004	(India) Raphael (Ralphy) Ezekiel Jhirad
2004	(Mexico) Marcos Metta Cohen
2004	(Mexico) Meny Samra Cohen
2004	(South Africa) Errol Anstey
2004	(United States) David Borowich
2004	(United States) Elana Yael Heideman
2004	(United States) Brian Sacks
2004	(United States) Moises Salinas
2005	(Argentina) Damian Szvalb
2005	(Canada) Gabriel Martell
2005	(Denmark) Dalia Melchior
2005	(Mexico) Enrique Olsoff
2005	(Russia) Evgeny Maryanchik
2005	(South Africa) Avrom Krengel
2005	(United Kingdom) David Collins
2005	(United Kingdom) Steven Elstein
2005	(United Kingdom) Jonathan Hantman
2005	(Uruguay) Gerardo Stuczynski
2005	(Venezuela) Elías Farache
2006	(Denmark) Andrea Uzan
2006	(Germany) Stanislav Skibinski
2006	(Mexico) Nathan Feldman
2006	(Mexico) Moises Mitrani
2006	(New Zealand) Phil Koningham
2006	(Sweden) Ted Ekeroth
2006	(United Kingdom) Stephen Rosenthal
2007	(Chile) Andrés Abramovicz
2007	(Chile) Marisol Garriga
2007	(Mexico) Jacobo Adat
2007	(South Africa) Tamar Lazarus
2007	(Sweden) Dmitri Vasserman
2007	(United Kingdom) Daniel Berke
2007	(United Kingdom) Shanee Fischer
2007	(Venezuela) Alberto Moryusef
2008	(Argentina) Fabio Kornblaum
2008	(Argentina) Daniel Lew
2008	(Denmark) Charlotte Thalmay
2008	(Mexico) Mauricio Faradji
2008	(Uruguay) Laura Taragan
2009	(South Africa) Laurence (Doron) Perez
2009	(Sweden) Torbjorn Karfunkel
2009	(United States) Deborah Isaac
2010	(United Kingdom) Arieh Grossman
2010	(United Kingdom) Jonathan Sacerdoti
2015	(Mexico) Benjamin Laniado
2016	(South Africa) Rowan Polovin
2016	(Mexico) Enrique Chmelnik
2019	(Mexico) Rebeca Mischne
2022	(Mexico) Jacques Waiss Caspi

In addition, the Winner of the South African Zionist Federation's "Zionist Quiz" for schools is awarded a Herzl Prize (through 2009).
