= Positive stereotype =

Subjectively favourable belief about a social group

In social psychology, a positive stereotype refers to a subjectively favourable belief held about a social group. Common examples of positive stereotypes are Asians with better math ability, African Americans with greater athletic ability, and women with being warmer and more communal. As opposed to negative stereotypes, positive stereotypes represent a "positive" evaluation of a group that typically signals an advantage over another group. As such, positive stereotypes may be considered a form of compliment or praise. However, positive stereotypes can have a positive or negative effect on targets of positive stereotypes. The positive or negative influence of positive stereotypes on targets depends on three factors: (1) how the positive stereotype is stated, (2) who is stating the positive stereotype, (3) in what culture the positive stereotype is presented (e.g., Western contexts vs. East Asian contexts).

== Prevalence ==
In The Nature of Prejudice (1954), Gordon Allport suggested that the categorisation of people into groups is adaptive. Although, this categorisation may allow for quicker processing of information present in one's environment, this process may result in stereotyping. Stereotypes have implications for targets of stereotypes and interpersonal interactions generally, because stereotypes assign traits and abilities to members of social groups due simply to their perceived group membership. Much research on prejudice and stereotypes has largely focused on negative stereotypes (e.g., the association of older adults with frailty) and the result of their prevalence (e.g., stereotype threat) on perceivers and targets.

Composed of three studies spanning nearly 40 years, the Princeton Trilogy (1933) is noted as one of the earliest set of studies documenting the actual content of stereotypes attributed to different ethnic groups and the change in content over time. In the initial study of Princeton students in 1933, students were asked to list the traits that were associated with various racial/ethnic groups (e.g., Germans, Jews, Negroes). In this initial study, students were found to associate distinct traits with each social group and that there was a high consensus among beliefs (e.g., Germans were scientifically minded and industrious, Italians were artistic, and Negroes were superstitious and lazy). In the follow-up studies in 1951 and in 1969, the researchers found that the consensus and content of the stereotypes had changed in the four decades after the initial study.

In the U.S., the content of stereotypes that people explicitly associate to other groups have become more positive since the onset of early studies, such as the Princeton Trilogy, that measured stereotype content. The positive change in content can be attributed to multiple factors:

- the relative change in status of different social groups
- the expression of negative stereotypes as being less socially acceptable
- the increased intergroup contact of people of different ethnicities and nationalities

Although both positive stereotypes and negative stereotypes require making generalisations about a group, positive stereotypes and their expression may not be seen as rooted in prejudice because of their positive valence. Additionally, because positive stereotypes may, on the surface, indicate a positive view of a social identity, expression of positive stereotypes in social interactions may not be as readily suppressed. As a result, positive stereotypes are more likely to be used to when describing a group than a negative stereotype, (e.g., "Women are more warm than men" versus saying "Women are less competent than men") which may contribute to their increase in prevalence.

== Interaction with negative stereotypes ==
In their stereotype content model (SCM), Fiske and colleagues (2002) provided evidence that being positively stereotyped in one domain typically leads to being correspondingly negatively stereotyped in another domain. In their model of "mixed" stereotype content, they focused on the stereotypes of warmth and competence. In their model, they propose that "people want to know others' intent (i.e., warmth) and their capability to pursue their intentions (i.e., competence)" (p. 879)

The researchers indicated that the motivation to positively stereotype groups as either warm or competent stemmed from perceived status and competition of an out-group. According to the SCM, out-groups are positively stereotyped as more competent to the extent that they are more powerful or hold higher-status. And correspondingly, out-groups are positively stereotyped as more warm to the extent that they are seen as less competition. However being positively stereotyped on one dimension usually corresponded with being negatively stereotyped on the other dimension.

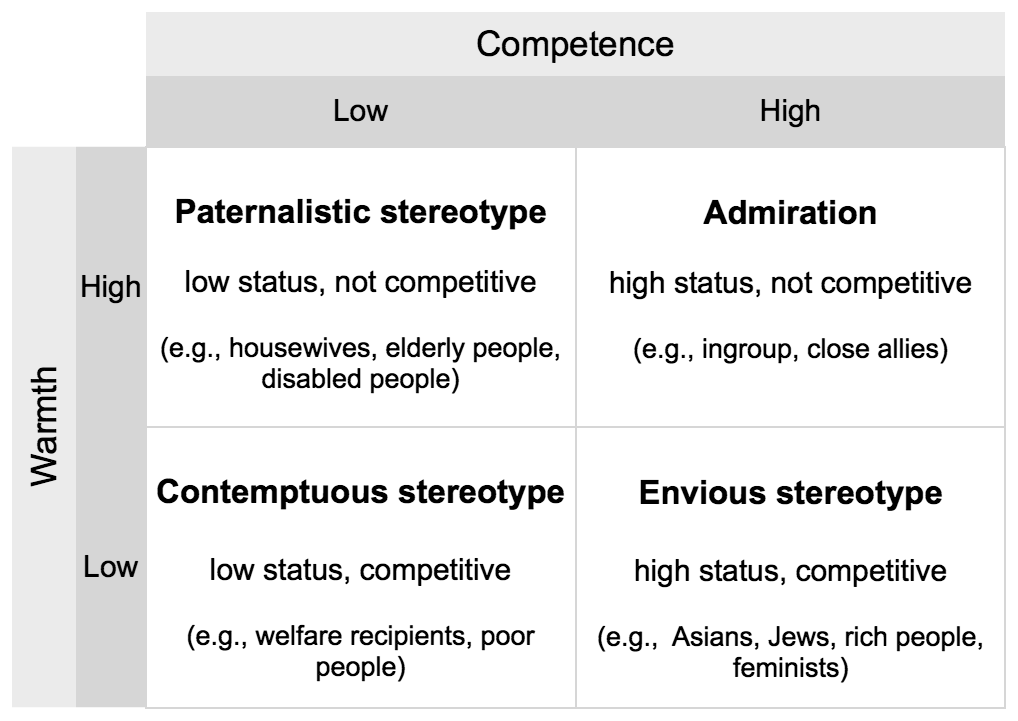
Stereotype Content Model from Fiske et al., 2002

For instance, social out-groups viewed as subordinate and not competitive (e.g., elderly people) are often stereotyped as higher in warmth, but lower in competence. Being high in warmth and low in competence is considered to be a paternalistic stereotype, as the out-group is perceived as not inclined or incapable to harm the in-group. On the other end of the spectrum, an out-group that is perceived as high-status and highly competitive (e.g., rich people) may evoke an envious stereotype. These groups would likely be positively stereotyped as being high in competence to justify their higher relative position in society (compared to one's own in-group). However, feelings of envy or resentment about the group's higher status is justified by perceiving them as more cold (i.e., lower in warmth).

Follow-up research has identified that for some subordinate groups being positively stereotyped as high in competence may vary in meaning. For instance, Black athletes and Black musicians are positively stereotyped as high in competence. However, when investigated further, the high competence rating was attributed to being competent due to talent rather than due to intelligence.

== Advantages ==
Researchers have found that being associated with a group that is positively stereotyped in a domain (e.g., academics) can result in enhanced performance if one is led to think about one's group membership, but not the specific stereotype. For instance, researchers have studied how the performance of Asian-Americans is affected when they are exposed to the common stereotype that Asian-Americans are good at mathematics. In one study, before taking a math test, one group of Asian-Americans were subtly led to think about the association of Asians and better math ability through answering questions about their ethnic identity and family history (e.g., what languages they spoke, how many generations of their family lived in America). Compared to both another group of Asian-Americans that were explicitly reminded about the positive association between Asian-Americans and math and a control condition that was not reminded of their ethnicity or the positive stereotype, the group lead to indirectly think of the positive Asian stereotype answered more math questions correctly. In a separate study, Asian-American women subtly led to think about their ethnic identity (i.e., Asian) performed more accurately on a quantitative task than did Asian-American women led to think about their gender identity (i.e., woman) and women that were not made to think about either identity. In a study of age and memory, older individuals primed to think of positive stereotypes associated with older age and wisdom showed increased performance on a set of memory tasks.

== Disadvantages ==
When positive stereotypes are expressed or simply believed as true about a group and its members, positive stereotypes can be related to a number negative consequences for targets' emotional and psychological states, their performance-based behaviors, and others' judgments of them. The ambiguity of positive stereotypes when encountered over time might come to be seen as a form of microaggression.

=== Depersonalization ===
Because stereotypes communicate beliefs held about a group, being the target of a stereotype can evoke a sense of being depersonalized or being seen only by one's group membership instead of as a unique individual. Feeling depersonalized has been found to determine the extent of a person's negative reaction to being the target of a positive stereotype. For example, women who were told that they had performed well on a math test reported higher levels of anger and greater desire to attack or avoid the male test administrator if when he gave them their positive feedback, he said, "Wow...you did really well for a woman" versus if he simply said, "Wow...you did really well." In a set of studies by Siy and Cheryan (2013), women and U.S.-born Asian Americans were made the target of positive stereotypes (e.g., You women are so cooperative, I know all Asians are good at math). Both women and Asian-American targets expressed greater dislike and negativity towards the person expressing the stereotype. In the study of Asian-Americans, those participants that were the target of positive stereotypes reported feeling greater levels of anger and annoyance than those who were not targets of positive stereotypes. The amount of negativity felt and expressed was influenced by the extent that the positive stereotype made the participants feel depersonalised.

To determine whether this negative reaction to feeling depersonalized by a positive stereotype is found across different cultures, Siy and Cheryan (2013) also studied U.S. born Asian-Americans compared to non-U.S. born Asian-Americans. They found that both U.S. and non-U.S. born groups reported similar levels of depersonalization as a result of being a target of a positive stereotype. However, unlike in their previous studies, the extent of feeling depersonalized did not predict negative reactions to being stereotyped for non-U.S. born Asian-Americans. The researchers asserted that non-U.S. born Asian-Americans may react less negatively to being depersonalized and thus would react less negatively to being the target of a positive stereotype. This difference was attributed to general differences in values of East Asian cultures, which place more value on interdependence, and Western cultures (e.g., U.S. culture), which place more value on independence. Eastern cultures promote more collectivistic values and individuals are more likely to describe themselves in relation to others and by their group memberships. In contrast, Western cultures promote more individualistic values and thus individuals place high importance on being seen as a unique individual, separate from others. Because being the target of a stereotype may signal that an individual is being judged by their group membership and not by their individual traits, someone who values being viewed as an individual may have an increased negative reaction to being depersonalized. Thus, the extent of a target's negative reaction to being depersonalized by a positive stereotype can depend largely on the relevant culture in which the stereotype is expressed, and importantly, how a person views themselves and wants to be viewed in relation to others.

=== Association with negative stereotypes ===
"Positive stereotypes may signal to targets that negative stereotypes are not far behind" -In Prejudice Masquerading as Praise (Siy & Cheryan, 2016, p. 953)

Social groups typically are associated with both positive and negative stereotypes. For example, women are positively stereotyped as warm but negatively stereotyped as weak; Asian-Americans are positively stereotyped as competent but negatively stereotyped as cold; Black Americans are positively stereotyped as athletic but negatively stereotyped as unintelligent. An individual targeted by a positive stereotype associated with their social group may assume that the stereotyper also believes they possess the negative stereotypes associated with the group. The negative stereotype that is assumed to be held by the stereotyper depends on to what social group the positive stereotype references. In a study by Siy & Cheryan (2016), Asian-American men were either exposed to a positive stereotype about their race (e.g., "Asians are ambitious") or their gender (e.g., "Men are ambitious"). Asian men that were positively stereotyped based on their gender were more likely to believe that negative gender stereotypes (e.g., aggressive, dominant) were also being applied to them than those who were only targets of positive racial stereotypes. In a similar manner, Asian men that were targets of positive racial stereotypes were more likely to believe that negative racial stereotypes (e.g., bad at driving, bad at English) were also being applied to them.

=== Example ===
The Model Minority Myth perfectly explains how positive stereotypes have negative consequences. The model minority myth is a stereotype against Asian Americans and it states how all Asian Americans are intelligent, hard-working, and academically more successful than other minorities. In order words, it says that Asian Americans outperform other racial groups in school.

The model minority myth is a positive stereotype, which says Asian Americans outperform other groups, but it also has negative stereotypes associated with it. Due to this stereotype, Asian Americans are faced with frequent racism, which causes interracial tension. On top of that, the myth deemphasizes the academic problems that Asian Americans have. Since Asian Americans are perceived with this "positive" stereotype, they tend to hide their personal problems because they don't want to break this "positive" stereotype around them. It makes people hide in a shell because they don't want to be the odd one out. They want to fit into the stereotype, even if they don't. This positive stereotype ignores the diversity in the group of Asian Americans by not understanding that not all Asian Americans have same resources or even the same experiences.

The model minority myth puts into perspective how good stereotypes can still be associated with negative stereotypes, so people need to be careful of their words because it can make someone feel less of a person in their group.
