= Jonathan Sacerdoti =

British journalist and broadcaster (born 1980)

- Born: February 1980 (age 46); London, England
- Education: Balliol College, Oxford (BA)
- Occupations: Journalist; campaigner
- Awards: Herzl Award

Jonathan Sacerdoti is a British broadcaster, journalist, and TV producer. He covers stories relating to the United Kingdom and Europe, as well as terrorism and extremism stories, race relations, Middle East analysis and the British royal family. He is also a public intellectual who has spoken widely in defence of Israel and against antisemitism.

== Early life and education ==
Sacerdoti's father Cesare was a Holocaust survivor, and his paternal grandfather was an Italian rabbi.

Sacerdoti graduated from Balliol College, Oxford, where he studied English Language and Literature. In 2001, Sacerdoti was awarded the University of Oxford OxTALENT prize for IT and literature.

== Career ==
=== Journalism ===
Sacerdoti had his first byline in a national newspaper when he was 17 years old, writing for The Daily Telegraph. He is a columnist for The Spectator, The Algemeiner, and The Jewish Chronicle, for whom he was previously a Special Correspondent covering investigations, features, and major news stories. He also contributes to other publications, including the Daily Express, The Daily Mail, Haaretz, The New Statesman, and Business Insider.

=== Broadcasting ===
As a reporter or expert analyst, Sacerdoti has appeared on various TV channels. In 2013, he became UK correspondent for the Israeli 24-hour news channel i24news, while, in 2020, he was appearing as a regular UK correspondent on the financial news network Cheddar News. In 2022, he started to cover the British royal family on Fox News and participated in the Fox documentary Who is King Charles III? In the US, Sacerdoti is a guest commentator on UK affairs on E! Channel's Daily Pop. He has also appeared as a co-host and guest on the American publication Us Weekly's podcasts. His work as a voice artist includes narrating an English language audiobook of the Quran in 2019.

=== The Jewish Chronicle acquisition ===
In 2020, Sacerdoti was part of a consortium of business and media figures which acquired The Jewish Chronicle. It had announced its intention to seek a creditor's voluntary liquidation, with 54 journalists and support staff told they would be made redundant, an outcome which was avoided through the acquisition.

=== TV production ===
Sacerdoti worked as a television producer on the Channel 4 breakfast news programme RI:SE and on the Channel 5 news discussion programme The Wright Stuff. He has also worked as a development producer on entertainment and factual programmes for various production companies, including Endemol, where his original format, My Childhood, was commissioned by the BBC and won BAFTA Scotland's Best Factual Programme 2006. Whilst at Endemol, he worked on the development of the UK version of Deal or No Deal. Between 2005 and 2006, he worked at ITV, and then at Shine TV until 2007. In 2016, he set up a communications and design practice, Sacerdoti Creative Consultancy.

== Voluntary work and campaigning ==
Sacerdoti represented the Spanish and Portuguese Jews' Congregation on the Board of Deputies of British Jews and has been a member of its international division. He is among the founding trustees of the charity Campaign Against Antisemitism and served as its Director of Communications until August 2016. He is also a trustee of the Simon Wiesenthal Centre's United Kingdom branch. Sacerdoti is on the council of The Montefiore Endowment, a charity that administers the endowment of the 19th-century British philanthropist Sir Moses Montefiore.

== Views on antisemitism and racism ==
As a journalist and a campaigner, Sacerdoti has spoken extensively about antisemitism and other forms of racism, as well as about the Holocaust. He has spoken about the racial persecution his father experienced as a child under the Italian racial laws, and written about the members of the Catholic Church in Florence who hid and saved his father as a child during the Holocaust He argues that true anti-racism requires individuals to act fairly to protect each other, using the example of the Catholic priests and nuns who saved his father's life: "When faced with the question of what our duty is as citizens of the world, each of us can choose to make a difference, just as they did."

He is critical of the use of the acronyms BAME and BIPOC because they exclude Jewish, Gypsy, Roma and Travellers of Irish Heritage groups, and because they create "linguistic opacity."

He was critical of Whoopi Goldberg when she said on The View that the Holocaust was "not about race," calling her comments "absolute nonsense" and "outrageous". He questioned Goldberg's assertion that she was Jewish and argued against her use of a Jewish stage name, as well as her writing racist anti-black jokes for a white comedian to deliver in blackface. Sacerdoti has been critical of what he saw as the late short-story and children's stories author Roald Dahl's anti-Jewish racism, suggesting that his "antisemitic attitudes were, and probably remain, widespread among some parts of British society."

He has written extensively about antisemitism in Arabic language TV broadcasts, as well as about positive interactions between Jews and Arabs in the Middle East.

== Views on Israel ==
Sacerdoti has spoken publicly in defence of Israel against accusations of genocide, war crimes and apartheid. In 2010, he was awarded the World Zionist Organization's Herzl Award for his journalism covering Israel and the Middle East.

In November 2024, he took part in a public debate at the Oxford Union of the motion: “This house believes Israel is an apartheid state responsible for genocide”. Arguing against the proposal, along with Sacerdoti, were Natasha Hausdorff, Yoseph Haddad, and Mosab Hassan Yousef, while arguing in favour were Miko Peled, Susan Abulhawa, and Mohammed El-Kurd. The motion was passed with 278 votes in favour and 59 against. The debate was marked by significant heckling particularly during Sacerdoti's speech, and police investigation of some of the anti-Israel speeches.

== Other appearances ==
=== Lectures ===
Sacerdoti has spoken both as a keynote speaker and as a panellist at international conferences organised by Harvard University, National Chengchi University in Taiwan, the American University in Dubai and Keio University in Tokyo. He has given lectures on the nature of terrorism in Europe. Sacerdoti has also debated at the Oxford Union and Cambridge Union.

=== BBC News ===
Sacerdoti has appeared regularly on BBC Radio 4 programmes, including the Today programme and The Moral Maze. He was a regular panellist on BBC World's Dateline London.
