= Innovation: Africa =

US-based non-profit organization

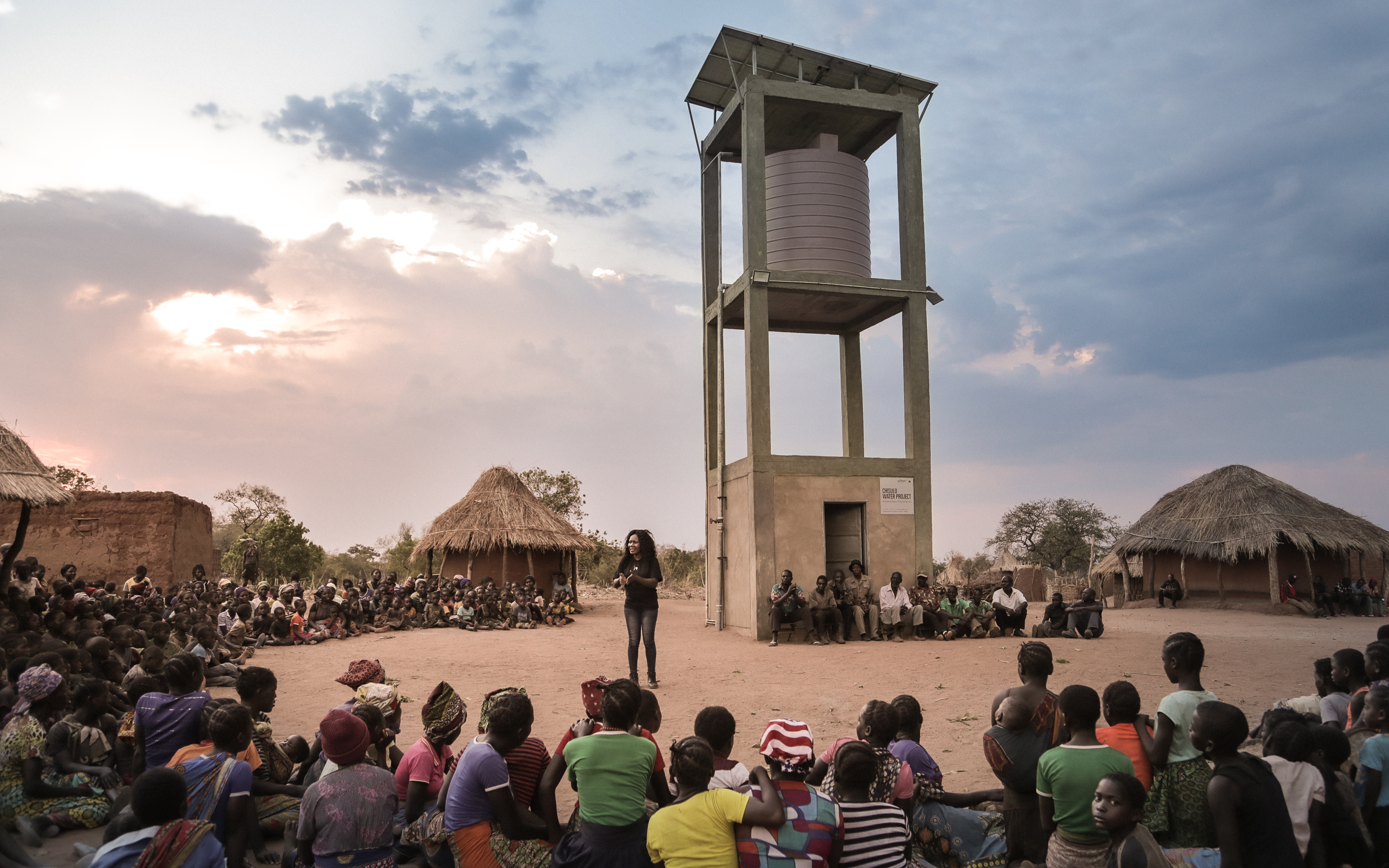
- Innovation: Africa transforming an entire rural African village with a solar powered water system
- Founded: 2008
- Founder: Sivan Yaari
- Type: 501(c)(3)
- Location: New York City, United States, Israel, Africa
- Region served: Africa
- Services: Solar panels, agricultural and solar technology, and water pumps.
- Website: www.innoafrica.org

Innovation: Africa is a non-profit 501(c)(3) organization which brings Israeli solar, water and agricultural innovations to rural African villages. Since its establishment in 2008, the organization has completed over 1400 projects providing light and solar energy to schools and medical centres and crucially, pumping clean water to more than 6 million people across 10 African countries. Innovation: Africa maintains headquarters in the US and Israel and has projects across Uganda, Malawi, Tanzania, Zambia, South Africa, Cameroon, Ethiopia, the Democratic Republic of Congo, Senegal, and Eswatini.

Innovation: Africa invests in the sustainability and maintenance of its solar powered clean water projects. A key component of their sustainable approach includes training local villagers as water technicians; for each water project, 10 community members are trained, helping foster self-sufficiency and providing skills for broader employment opportunities. Innovation: Africa's UN-award-winning remote monitoring system allows real-time tracking of water flow and solar energy production, enabling prompt maintenance and long-term project sustainability.

== History ==
Innovation: Africa was founded in 2008 by Israeli-born Sivan Yaari. Yaari’s first experience in Africa was at the age of 20 when she witnessed suffering due to the lack of basic necessities such as electricity and access to clean water. With a master's degree in International Energy Management and Policy from Columbia University, Yaari began bringing solar energy solutions to African villages, as she knew that energy was the key to breaking the cycle of poverty and enhancing living conditions throughout rural communities.

Innovation: Africa now has a team of over 140 full-time employees, including more than 90 hydrogeologists, civil, water and electrical engineers, working with local contractors across Africa to provide light to schools and medical centers and pump safe and clean water throughout remote villages.

Since 2012, Innovation: Africa has been granted Special Consultative Status to the United Nations Economic and Social Council and was awarded the Innovation Award at the United Nations for its Remote Monitoring Technology, which enables full transparency and real-time tracking of the solar and water systems at each of their installations.

In partnership with UNICEF, Innovation: Africa expanded its program to Cameroon to serve refugees and asylum seekers from the Central African Republic and Nigeria. It provided aid to 259,000 refugees in 2017-18 alone.

In April 2020, Innovation: Africa ramped up its efforts to prevent the spread of COVID-19 in particularly vulnerable villages with teams on the ground drilling and constructing solar water-pumping systems. Recognizing the threat of the global COVID-19 pandemic, the organization expedited hundreds of projects to provide access to clean water to villages and electricity in medical centers to power lifesaving medical equipment such as ventilators.

== Activities ==
=== Water ===
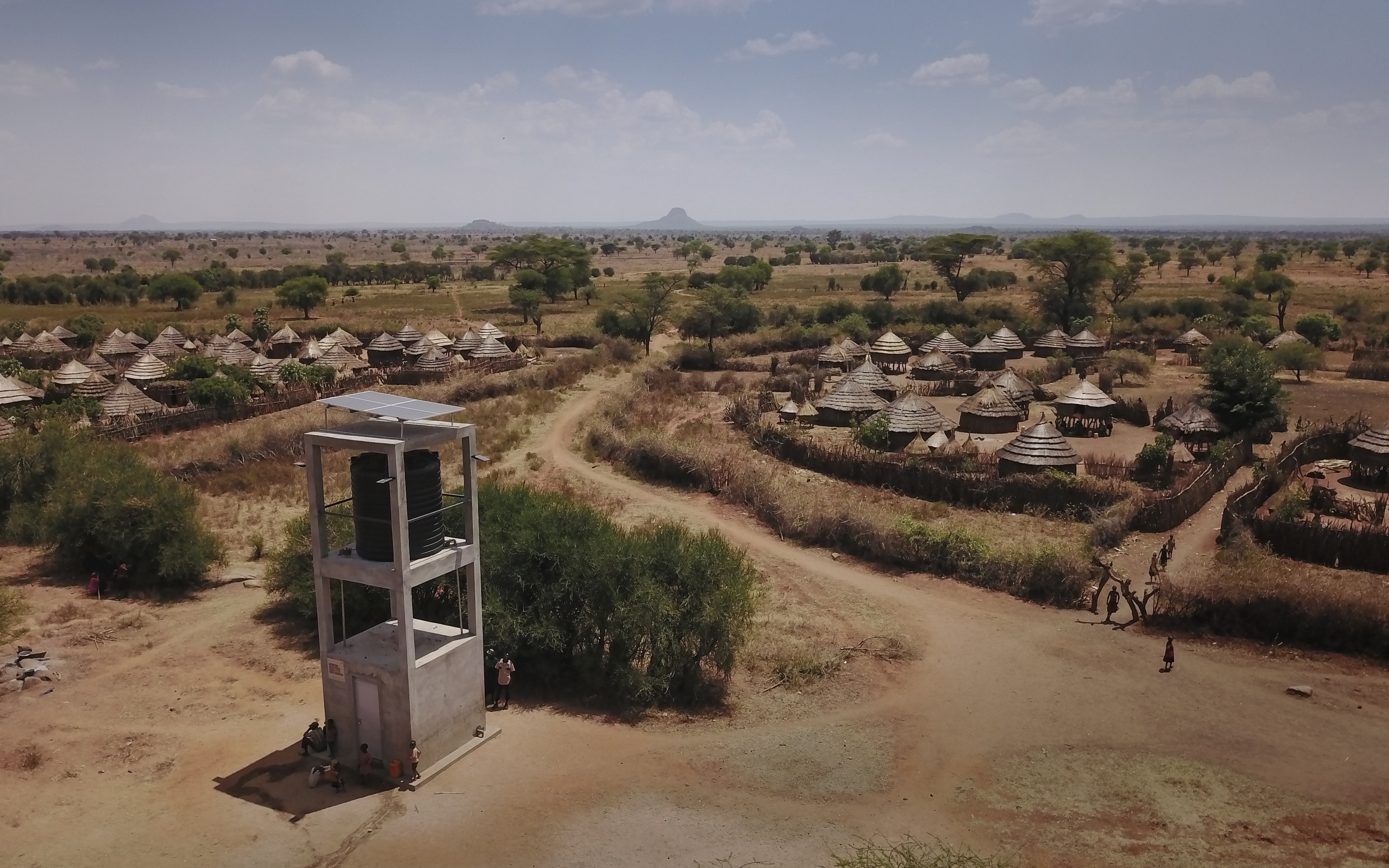
Safe drinking water set up from Innovation:Africa

Innovation: Africa installs solar-powered water pumps to access water from underground aquifers and bring clean water to taps installed throughout the village. Each solar water pumping system pumps an average of 30,000 liters of water per day and provides up to 10,000 people with clean water. It takes nearly 3 months to complete the necessary infrastructure for the solar water pumping system. This includes a ten-meter tower, a tank holding up to 10,000 liters, a solar pump and solar panels. From the start of the project, the community is involved, Innovation: Africa trains and hires locals to participate in the construction and maintenance.

=== Technology ===
To properly monitor projects, Innovation: Africa installs a remote monitoring system in each project which monitors how much water is being pumped and energy is consumed in each project while registering any problems in the system so potential issues can be fixed fast. The system allows the team and any donor to monitor projects in real time.

In 2019, Innovation: Africa’s engineering team developed a self-contained "energy box" which possesses everything needed to provide energy to off-grid schools and medical centers which includes LED light bulbs, lithium-ion battery, and integrates the remote management system.

=== Solar power for schools and medical centers ===
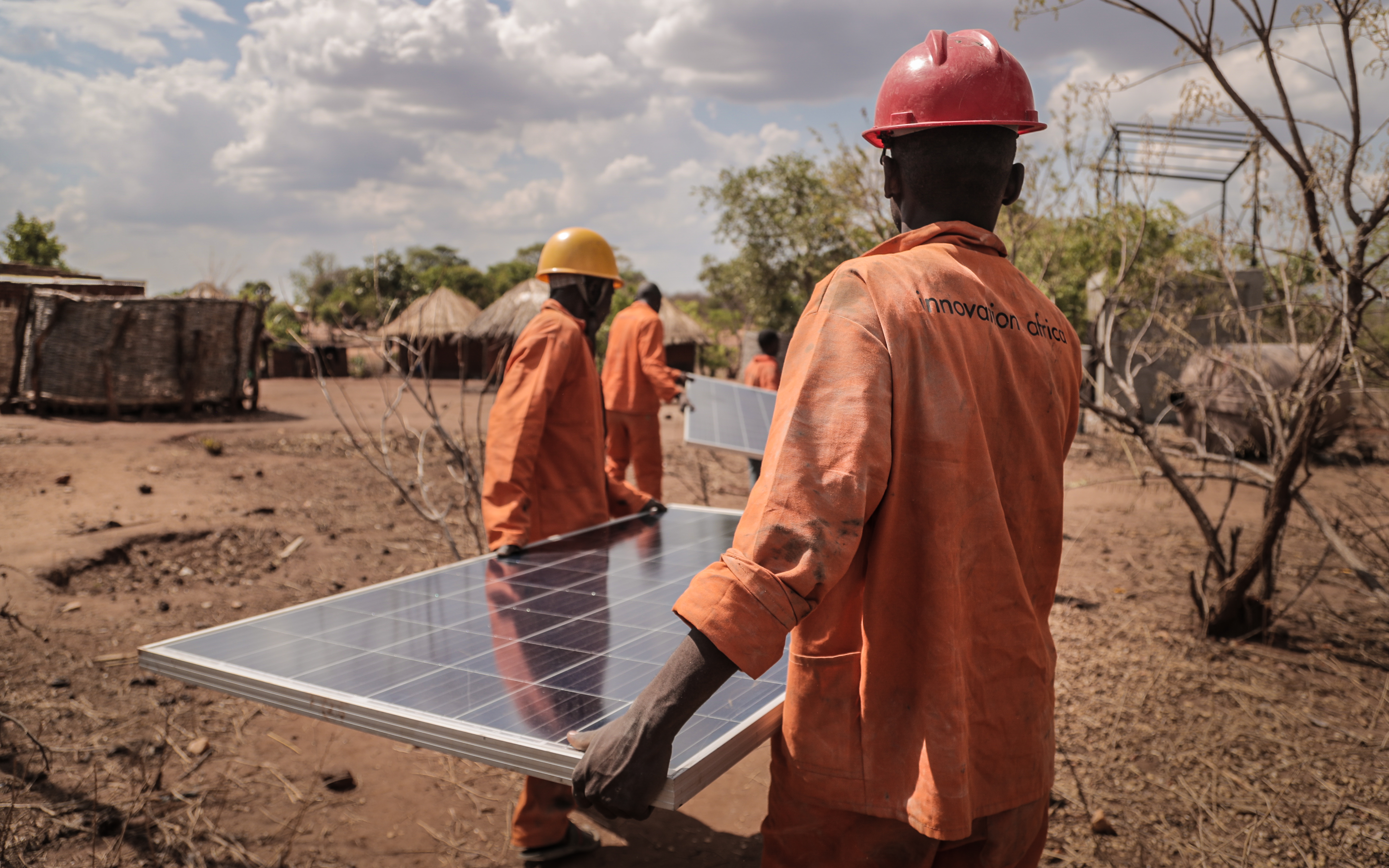
Solar energy is driving change across rural Africa

Innovation: Africa installs solar energy systems which provide power for schools, orphanages and medical clinics by installing solar systems.

In schools, Innovation: Africa provides computers and light to the classrooms and the homes of teachers. In medical centers, light is provided to the facilities as well as the homes of nurses and doctors. Innovation: Africa also supplies solar refrigeration, to properly store medicines, vaccines, and other necessary medical equipment.

Funds to maintain the sustainable solar systems, such as the replacement of light bulbs and batteries, are generated by the village communities through Innovation: Africa’s help establishing micro-businesses such as phone charging stations and barber shops that charge small fees.

=== Drip irrigation ===
When possible, Innovation: Africa installs Israeli drip irrigation systems which generate more affordable and larger crop yields using less water, and provide a source of food and income for farmers and their families. Providing access to water enables villages to create new businesses and foster financial independence. New businesses include growing and selling vegetables to the local market as well as the manufacture of bricks and raising livestock.

== Funding and costs ==
Innovation: Africa is a registered 501(c)(3) based in the United States and is funded entirely by private donors. Donors include foundations, philanthropies, corporations, and individuals (many bar/bat mitzvah children) as well as schools and communities that have joined together to “adopt” a village. A one time donation of $85,000 covers a solar water project which provides clean drinking water to an entire village of up to 10,000 people, or $25,000 to provide electricity, computers and medical equipment for schools, orphanages or medical centers. Salaries and overhead are paid through foundations (grants), separate from funds raised for projects.

== Awards and recognition ==
In 2012, Innovation: Africa was granted special consultative status at the United Nations Economic and Social Council (ECOSOC). The following year, the organization was awarded the United Nations Innovation Award for its efficient and sustainable Israeli remote monitoring technology. In 2019, Innovation: Africa won the Innovative Diplomacy Award from the Abba Eban Institute. Uganda’s Prime Minister Ruhakana Rugunda described Innovation: Africa’s work as having been a catalyst in accelerating the relationship between Uganda and Israel.

In 2023, Sivan Yaari, Founder & CEO of Innovation: Africa presented at the United Nations World Water Day conference.

In 2026, Yaari was named a YPO Global Impact Award Honoree by Young Presidents' Organization (YPO) in recognition of her leadership and impact across more than 1,400 villages and 6 million people in Africa.

In October 2026, Yaari was awarded an honorary doctorate by Bar-Ilan University during its 70th anniversary gala.

== See also ==
- Netafim
