= Roberto Colom =

Spanish psychologists

Colom is Professor of Differential Psychology in the Department of Biological and Health Psychology at Universidad Autónoma de Madrid, from which he received his Ph.D. in 1989.
