= Toni Schmader =

American psychologist

Toni Schmader is a Professor and Canada Research Chair in social psychology at the University of British Columbia.

== Education ==
Schmader earned a PhD in social psychology in 1999 from the University of California, Santa Barbara. Previously she earned a Bachelor of Arts degree summa cum laude Washington and Jefferson College.

== Career ==
Schmader was named a Canada Research Chair in social psychology in 2010, receiving funding to "research the interplay between negative stereotypes, self-esteem, emotion, motivation and performance." Among her findings were that "women inhibit their own performance", getting higher scores on tests done under a fictitious name; and that girls are more likely to grow up believing that they can work outside the home if their fathers perform traditionally female domestic chores inside the home.

== Publications ==
- Jeff Greenberg, Toni Schmader, Jamie Arndt, Mark Landau Social Psychology: The Science of Everyday Life (now in its third edition)
- K Block, WM Hall, T Schmader, M Inness, E Croft. Social Psychology, 2018. 'Should I Stay or Should I Go?' doi:10.1027/1864-9335/a000343
- JP Jamieson, WB Mendes, E Blackstock, T Schmader. Journal of Experimental Social Psychology, 2010. 'Turning the knots in your stomach into bows: Reappraising arousal improves performance on the GRE.' doi:10.1016/j.jesp.2009.08.015
- M Johns, M Inzlicht, T Schmader. Journal of Experimental Psychology: General, 2008. 'Stereotype threat and executive resource depletion: Examining the influence of emotion regulation.' doi:10.1037/a0013834
- T Schmader, M Johns. Journal of personality and social psychology, 2003. 'Converging evidence that stereotype threat reduces working memory capacity.' doi:10.1037/0022-3514.85.3.440
