= Self-affirmation =

Social psychology theory

Self-affirmation theory is a psychological theory that focuses on how individuals adapt to information or experiences that are threatening to their self-concept. Claude Steele originally popularized self-affirmation theory in the late 1980s, and it remains a well-studied theory in social psychological research.

Self-affirmation theory contends that if individuals reflect on values that are personally relevant to them, they are less likely to experience distress and react defensively when confronted with information that contradicts or threatens their sense of self.

Experimental investigations of self-affirmation theory suggest that self-affirmation can help individuals cope with threat or stress and that it might be beneficial for improving academic performance, health, and reducing defensiveness.

== Overview ==
There are four main principles of self-affirmation theory.

=== People try to protect their self-integrity ===
Self-affirmation theory proposes that individuals are driven to protect their self-integrity. According to self-affirmation theory, self-integrity is one's concept of oneself as a good, moral person, who acts in ways that are in accord with cultural and social norms. Steele purported that the self is made up of different domains: roles, values, and belief systems. Roles include responsibilities a person has, such as being a parent, friend, student, or professional. Values are aspirations people live in accordance to, including things like living healthfully and treating others with respect. Belief systems include the ideologies to which a person ascribes, such as religious or political beliefs. Self-integrity can take many forms. For example, self-integrity can take the form of being independent, intelligent, a helpful member of a society, part of a family, and/or part of a group. Threats against a person's self-integrity are events or messages that imply an individual is not good or adequate in a personally relevant domain. Self-affirmation theory suggests that when individuals face threat to one of these domains, they are motivated to maintain a positive global image of themselves.

=== Drives to protect the sense of self are often defensive ===
Self-affirmation theory purports that when individuals are faced with information that threatens their self-integrity, the response to this information is often defensive in nature. Defensive reactions attempt to minimize the threat in order to preserve the sense of self. Examples of defensive reactions include denial, avoiding the threat, and changing one's appraisal of the event in order to make it less threatening.

=== Self-integrity is flexible ===
Instead of having one self-concept (e.g., I am a good parent), self-affirmation theory posits that individuals flexibly define who they are using various roles (e.g., I am a good parent, child, and worker). Having a flexible sense of self allows individuals to offset weaknesses in one domain, by highlighting the strengths in another domain. That is, if someone perceives threat to one domain, he or she can accommodate this threat by upholding a value in another domain. Self-affirmations can come from many sources. Having a flexible self-concept allows people to adapt in the face of threat.

=== Actions that promote one's values can reduce perceived threat ===
It is theorized that engaging in activities that promote the values, beliefs, and roles that are central to an individual's identity can promote self-integrity. Promoting one's values can affirm the individual and reduce the perceived threat. Engaging in such actions when facing threat serves to remind individuals of the broad, principal values by which they define themselves and their lives. This change in perspective shifts attention away from the threat in one domain of the self toward a larger context of who they are. It is thought that when people operate from this broader perspective, they react less defensively to the threat, which allows them to act more effectively. Self-Affirmations can occur by both reflecting on a personally relevant value, belief, or role, as well as engaging in an activity that might evoke a personally relevant value, such as spending time with family if that is personally relevant.

Taken together, the four principles suggest that when confronted with information that threatens self-concept, the person experiences distress and is subsequently motivated to self-defense. It is actually affirmation that allows people to see otherwise-threatening information as more self-relevant and valuable. However, the defensive reaction can impede more adaptive ways to solve the problem (like engaging in problem-solving or changing unhealthy behaviors). It is thought that affirming an important value unrelated to the threat helps individuals to shift their perspective to their broader life context. Having a broad viewpoint diminishes the perceived threat, allowing individuals to act less defensively and more effectively.

== Paradigms used to study self-affirmation theory ==
In laboratory experiments, psychologists induce self-affirmation in participants in order to investigate the influence of self-affirmation on individuals' well-being. There are two chief methods used to self-affirm participants in experimental studies.

=== Values essay ===
One of the most common ways to induce self-affirmation is to have participants write about a personally relevant value. In order to do this, participants rank a list of values from most important to least important to them. The list typically includes the following value domains: aesthetic, social, political, religious, economic, and theoretical values. Participants then write about the value they ranked as most important and how it is meaningful to them for 5 minutes.

=== Values list ===
The Allport-Vernon-Lindzey Values Scale is another measure that is administered to participants to induce self-affirmation in the laboratory. Participants choose one of two answers after reading a statement about a value. An example item from the religion scale would be "The more important study for mankind is (a) mathematics (b) theology". This allows researchers to see where an individual's personal interests and values lie. It is thought that answering questions about a value domain that they find important will make that value more salient to them, resulting in self-affirmation. There are six different value domains on the Allport-Vernon-Lindzey Values scale: religion, theoretical, aesthetic, political, social, and economic.

== Empirical support ==
Extant empirical research demonstrates that self-affirmations can be beneficial in reducing individuals' stress response as well as their defensiveness toward threats.

=== Buffering against stress ===
In one study investigating the effects of self-affirmation on stress response, undergraduate participants completed the Trier social stress test, a standardized laboratory paradigm used to induce stress in participants. In the Trier Social Stress task, participants are asked to give a short speech in front of a panel of judges who do not give any comments or positive feedback to the participant. Following the speech, participants must complete a mental arithmetic task, in which they count backwards from 2,083 in increments of 13 while being told by the judges to go faster. Prior to completing the Trier Social Stress Task, half of the participants completed a variation of values list self-affirmation task. Participants who completed the values list had significantly lower stress response than individuals in the control condition, as indicated by a lower cortisol response in affirmed participants compared to participants who did not complete the self-affirmation condition.

In a different experiment, undergraduate students completed difficult problem solving puzzles in the presence of an evaluator. Participants also reported how much chronic stress they endured over the past month. Prior to completing the problem-solving puzzles half of the participants completed a values essay self-affirmation task. For the individuals who did not complete the self-affirmation task, low-stress participants performed significantly better than high-stress participants. For individuals in the self-affirmation condition, high-stress individuals performed equally as well as low-stress individuals. Findings suggest that self-affirmation buffered against the negative effects of stress on problem-solving performance.

For another experiment, undergraduates were recruited to participate in a research study two weeks prior to completing a mid-term exam. All participants collected urine samples for 24 hours two weeks prior to their midterm (baseline) as well as for the 24 hours prior to their midterm examination so their catecholamine levels could be measured. Catecholamine levels are thought to be high when individuals are experiencing higher stress. Half of participants completed two values essays in the two weeks leading up to their midterm examination. Participants who did not complete the self-affirmation condition demonstrated increased catecholamine response from baseline to their midterm exam. However, participants who completed the two values essays did not show an increase in catecholamine levels from baseline to their midterm.

Preliminary research results suggest that self-affirmation can protect against the negative consequences of stress. More research is needed to understand how self-affirmations decrease stress responses.

=== Reducing defensiveness ===
Results from studies provide support for the idea that when individuals complete an activity that affirms their self-integrity they are less defensive and more accepting of information that is potentially threatening. However, more research is needed to better understand why people are more open-minded after they have completed an affirmation task.

== Applications ==
=== Education ===
Studies have examined the effects of self-affirmation on the academic performance of historically marginalized groups such as African American and Latino American students, who face a multitude of daily threats in the school environment. Seventh grade students took part in a two-year study. Half of the students completed a values essay about their most important value approximately seven to eight times over the course of two academic years, while the other half wrote a values essay about why their least important value might be of value to someone else. The study tracked the students' grades for three years. Ethnic minority students in the self-affirmation condition received higher grade point averages than the ethnic minority students who wrote about why their least important value might be important to someone else. There was no effect of self-affirmation in white students. Findings suggest that for students who face daily, repeated stressors at school, self-affirmation buffers against worsening school performance.

Similarly, values affirmation decreased the achievement gap for college students from low socioeconomic status and for women in introductory physics courses. These findings suggest that self-affirmation can have a buffering effect on academic achievement for groups who face the most threat.

=== Health ===
Women concerned with their weight were recruited for a study. Concern with weight has similar effects of stress in that it can cause psychological distress, poor eating, and weight gain. Half of the women completed a values essay. Self-affirmed participants had lost more weight, had lower body mass index, and smaller waist circumference than non-affirmed women.

Patients with end stage renal disease participated in a study assessing the effects of self-affirmation on adherence to phosphate binders that facilitate control of phosphate levels. Poor phosphate control in this population can be dangerous and life-threatening. There was a significant improvement in serum phosphate levels for the affirmed patients compared to the group of non-affirmed patients, suggesting better adherence to phosphate binders.

== Factors that influence the effectiveness of self-affirmations ==
=== Culture ===
Individualist and collectivist cultures place different levels of importance on belonging to in-groups, and it is thought that this may vary the effects of self-affirmation. One study investigated the effects of self-affirmation on reducing cognitive dissonance. This study found that self-affirmed participants from individualist cultures saw reductions in cognitive dissonance, whereas self-affirmed participants from collectivist cultures did not experience a reduction in cognitive dissonance. Another study examined the effect on individuals from individualist and collectivist backgrounds of writing a values essay about a value that was important to the participant compared to a value that was important to the participant's family. The authors found reduced cognitive dissonance for participants from collectivist cultures who wrote about values important to them and their families, and found reduced cognitive dissonance for participants from individualist cultures who wrote about a value important to just them.

=== Importance of the threatened domain ===
Benefits from self-affirmation are thought to primarily occur when the perceived threat is in an area of importance to the individual. For example, in the experiment detailed above in which coffee drinkers read an article about caffeine consumption and increased risk of breast cancer, self-affirmation only reduced defensiveness in individuals who were heavy coffee drinkers and not in occasional coffee drinkers. Because an article on the risks associated with caffeine consumption might not pose the same threat to occasional coffee drinkers as to heavy coffee drinkers, self-affirmation likely does not provide the same benefit for occasional coffee drinkers. Thus, the importance of the threatened domain to one's self-integrity is thought to influence the effectiveness of self-affirmations.

== Factors underlying the effects of self-affirmation theory ==
Research has not yet identified the underlying mechanisms of how self-affirmation buffers against stress and reduces defensiveness. However, it is believed that there is not just one factor responsible for the effects of self-affirmation, but rather many. To date, increasing positive emotions and self-esteem have been investigated as mechanisms of self-affirmation, but the findings are mixed. Some studies have found that positive mood brings about similar reductions in defensiveness as self-affirmations. In contrast, several studies fail to detect any effect of self-affirmation on mood, suggesting self-affirmation does not operate via increases in positive mood. Similarly, results on the effects of self-affirmation on self-esteem are also mixed. Some studies have observed increases in self-esteem following self-affirmation, whereas other have found no effect on self-esteem. More research is needed to better understand how self-affirmation can provide benefit to individuals.
