= JANIP =

Jewish Academic Network for Israeli-Palestinian Peace, JANIP, was formed by the two progressive Zionist organizations Meretz USA (now Partners for Progressive Israel) and Ameinu.

JANIP was conceived as a group of North American academics who support an end to the Israeli occupation of the West Bank and Gaza and a negotiated two-state solution to the Israeli-Palestinian conflict.

As the mission statement states "The mission of JANIP is to bring together scholars, teachers, and administrators who reject the increasingly polarized debate surrounding the Palestinian–Israeli conflict. Our goal is to bring a voice into the conversation – out of our identification with and commitment to Israel – that supports a negotiated two-state solution, an end to occupation, and Israel’s withdrawal from Gaza and bilaterally agreed-upon settlements in the West Bank. Specifically, we believe in:

- The right of both peoples to self-determination within recognized, secure borders
- The concept of civil society in which conflicts are resolved without violence; terrorism or other extra-legal activities to which both the Palestinians and the Israelis are held strictly accountable
- Direct negotiations and mutual accommodation as the route to a true and enduring peace between the two societies.

Many, if not all, campus-based debates dealing with the Palestinian-Israeli conflict have been reduced to a simplified choice: either uncompromisingly pro-Israel or pro-Palestinian, with little or no consideration of the competing rightful claims of the other side. As a result, more critical perspectives and dialogue have become virtually impossible.

We believe that it is our responsibility as scholars and teachers to inject a voice of realism and moderation back into the public debate through public statements, op-ed articles, position papers, conferences, and other activities and to support other academics, students and members of the community who share these views."

JANIP sponsored two Pathways to Peace international academic conference on the Israeli-Palestinian conflict.
