= Joshua Aronson =

American social psychologist

- Education: University of California, Santa Cruz, Princeton University
- Known for: Work on stereotype threat and the achievement gap
- Awards: 2016 Society of Experimental Social Psychology's Scientific Impact Award (with Claude Steele)
- Scientific career
- Fields: Social psychology
- Institutions: New York University
- Thesis: From Dissonance to Dis-identification: The Impact of Consistency on Affirmation Responses to Self-esteem Threats (1992)

Joshua Michael Aronson is an American social psychologist and Associate Professor of Applied Psychology at New York University's Steinhardt School of Culture, Education, and Human Development. He is known for his pioneering work on stereotype threat, which he conducted in the 1990s along with Claude Steele and Steven Spencer. This work has shown that female, minority, and low-income children are stereotyped as performing worse on standardized tests, and that when they are taught to overcome these stereotypes, their standardized test scores improve. He also co-authored a study in 2009 in which he reported no evidence that African Americans' test scores had improved as a result of the election of Barack Obama as President of the United States the previous year.
