= Claude Steele =

American social psychologist and professor (born 1946)

Claude M. Steele
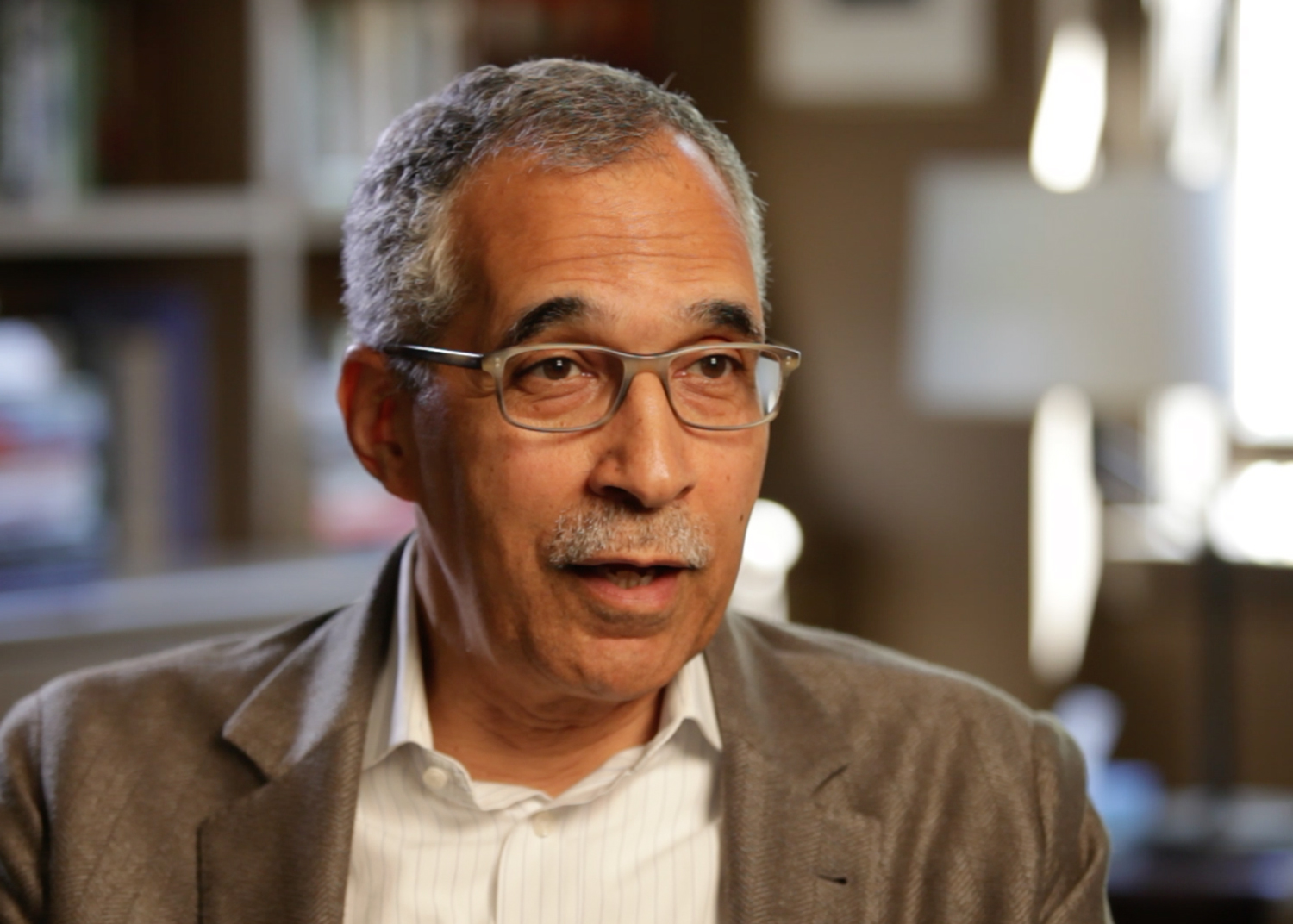
- Born: January 1, 1946 (age 80); Chicago, Illinois, U.S.
- Education: Hiram College (BA); Ohio State University (PhD)
- Known for: Stereotype threat, self-affirmation
- Scientific career
- Fields: Psychology (Social)
- Workplaces: Stanford University; University of California, Berkeley; Columbia University; University of Utah; University of Washington; University of Michigan
- Doctoral advisor: Thomas Ostrom
- Website: Official website

Claude Mason Steele (born January 1, 1946) is a social psychologist and emeritus professor at Stanford University, where he is the I. James Quillen Endowed Dean, emeritus at the Stanford University Graduate School of Education, and Lucie Stern Professor in the Social Sciences, emeritus.

Formerly he was the executive vice chancellor and provost at the University of California, Berkeley. He also served as the 21st provost of Columbia University for two years. Before that, he had been a professor of psychology at various institutions for almost 40 years.

He is best known for his work on stereotype threat and its application to minority student academic performance. His earlier work dealt with research on the self (like self-image and self-affirmation) as well as the role of self-regulation in addictive behaviors.

In 2010, he released his book, Whistling Vivaldi and Other Clues to How Stereotypes Affect Us, summarizing years of research on stereotype threat and the underperformance of minority students in higher education. In 2026, he released a second book, Churn: The Tension That Divides Us and How to Overcome It, which examines the anxiety people experience in diverse, high-stakes situations.

== Education and early life ==
Steele was born on January 1, 1946, to parents Ruth (a white social worker) and Shelby (an African-American truck driver) in Chicago, Illinois. Claude recalls his family, including his twin brother Shelby Steele and two other siblings, as being deeply interested in social issues and the civil rights movement of the 1950s and '60s. Steele remembers his father taking him and his brother to marches and rallies whenever possible. His father pushed him to achieve security in the context of securing employment, but Claude construed achievement as success in education. He enrolled at Hiram College in Hiram, Ohio, where he earned a B.A. in psychology in 1967.

At Hiram College, Steele's passion for reading novels led to an interest in how the individual faces the social world. After being fully immersed in the Civil Rights Movement and the issues of racial equality, rights, and the nature of prejudice as a child, Steele formed a desire to study the topics in a scientific manner. He was especially keen to discover their effects on social relationships and quality of life. Steele was inspired by African-American social psychologist Kenneth Clark's TV appearance discussing the psychological implications of the 1964 race riots in Harlem, New York City, which led to doing behavioral research. Steele conducted early experimental research at Hiram College in physiological psychology (looking at behavioral motives in Siamese fighting fish) and social psychology (studying how African-American dialect among kids maintains ethnic/racial identity), where he worked under the mentorship of social psychologist, Ralph Cebulla.

In graduate school, he studied social psychology, earning an M.A. in 1969 and a Ph.D. in 1971 at Ohio State University, with a minor in statistical psychology. His dissertation work, with faculty adviser Tom Ostrom at Ohio State, focused on attitude measurement and attitude change.

== Career ==
After receiving his PhD, Steele got his first job as an assistant professor of psychology for two years at the University of Utah. He then moved to the University of Washington for 14 years and received tenure in 1985.

In 1987, he moved to the University of Michigan, where he was a professor of psychology for four years. During the last two years, he simultaneously held the position of research scientist at Michigan's Institute for Social Research.

In 1991, he moved to Stanford University, where he was a professor of psychology for eighteen years, receiving the title of Lucie Stern Professor in the Social Sciences in 1997. At Stanford, he also served as chair of the Department of Psychology (1997–2000), director of the Center for Comparative Studies in Race and Ethnicity (2002–2005), and director of the Center for Advanced Study in the Behavioral Sciences (2005–2009), among various other positions.

In 2009, he left Stanford to become the 21st provost and chief academic officer at Columbia University for two years. He was responsible for faculty appointments, tenure recommendations, and overseeing financial planning and budgeting.

In 2011, he left Columbia and returned to Stanford, where he served as the I. James Quillen Dean for the Stanford University Graduate School of Education. In March 2014, he became the executive vice chancellor and provost of the University of California, Berkeley. He stepped down in April 2016 citing family reasons, shortly after a scandal erupted regarding the university's alleged disregard of sexual harassment.

== Research ==
Throughout his academic career, his work fell into three main domains of research under the broad subject area of social psychology: stereotype threat, self-affirmation, and addictive behaviors. Although separate and distinct, the three lines of research are linked by their shared focus on self-evaluation and how people cope with threats to their self-image and self-identities.

=== Addictive behaviors ===
Although many people primarily associate Steele with his significant contributions in the development of stereotype threat research, the 14 years of his post-doctoral academic career that he spent at the University of Washington were focused on addictive behaviors and the social psychology behind alcohol use and addiction. He was interested in the role of alcohol and drug use in self-regulation processes and social behavior. Among his major findings was that alcohol myopia, the cognitive impairment by alcohol use, reduces cognitive dissonance, leads to more extreme social responses, increases helping behavior, reduces anxiety when it is combined with a distracting activity, and enhances important self-evaluations.

=== Self-affirmation ===
While studying the effects of alcohol use on social behavior, Steele was formulating a theory about the effects of self-affirmation. Developed in the 1980s, self-affirmational processes referred to the ability to reduce threats to self-image by stepping back and affirming a value that is important to self-concept.

Steele often uses the example of smokers who are told that smoking will lead to significant negative health outcomes. The perception that they may be evaluated negatively by their willingness to engage in negative behaviors threatens their self-image. However, affirming a value in a domain completely unrelated to smoking but important to one's self-concept: joining a valued cause, or accomplishing more at work, will counter the negative effects of the self-image threat and re-establish self-integrity.

Self-affirmation theory was originally formulated as an alternative motivational explanation for cognitive dissonance theory that threats to the self led to a change in attitudes rather than psychologically inconsistent ideas, and self-affirmational strategies can reduce dissonance as effectively as attitude change.

His research on self-affirmation and its effects demonstrated the power of self-affirmation to reduce biased attitudes, lead to positive health behaviors, and even improve the academic performance of minority students.

=== Stereotype threat ===
Steele is best known for his work on stereotype threat and its application to explain real-world problems such as the underperformance of female students in mathematics and science classes as well as Black students in academic contexts. Steele first began to explore the issues surrounding stereotype threat at the University of Michigan, when his membership on a university committee called for him to tackle the problem of academic underachievement of minority students at the university. He discovered that the dropout rate for Black students was much higher than for their white peers even though they were good students and had received excellent SAT scores. That led him to form a hypothesis involving stereotype threat.

Stereotype threat refers to the threat felt in particular situations in which stereotypes relevant to one's collective identity exist, and the mere knowledge of the stereotypes can be distracting enough to negatively affect performance in a domain related to the stereotype.

Steele has demonstrated the far-reaching implications of stereotype threat by showing that it is more likely to undermine the performance of individuals highly invested in the domain being threatened and that stereotype threat can even lead to Black people having significant negative health outcomes.

The theories of stereotype threat can be applied for better understanding group differences in performance not only in intellectual situations but also in athletics.

Steele has spearheaded many successful interventions aimed at reducing the negative effects of stereotype threat, including how to provide critical feedback effectively to a student under the effects of stereotype threat, inspired by the motivating style of feedback of his graduate school adviser, Ostrom, and how teacher practices can foster a feeling of identity safety. That would improve performance outcomes by elementary school minority students.

== Whistling Vivaldi ==
In 2010, Steele published his first book, Whistling Vivaldi and Other Clues to How Stereotypes Affect Us, as part of the Issues of Our Time series of books exploring timely issues from the voices of modern intellectuals. Whistling Vivaldi focuses on the phenomenon of stereotype threat as it explains the trend of minority underperformance in higher education.

In his book, Steele discusses how identity contingencies or the cues in an environment that signal particular stereotypes attached to an aspect of one's identity can have a drastic negative effect on a person's functioning and how the effects can explain racial and gender performance gaps in academic performance.

Steele also offers a host of strategies for reducing stereotype threat and enhancing minority student performance; he hopes that society's knowledge of stereotype threat will lead to understanding and accepting diverse groups' differences.

== Controversy ==
In July 2015, Steele was tasked by the University of California, Berkeley, with managing the investigation of alleged sexual harassment of an employee by Sujit Choudhry, who was at that time Dean of its School of Law. Steele had been accused of being lenient with Choudhry by allowing him to retain his position as Dean. Some attributed the perceived leniency to a purported exchange for a Law School faculty appointment. University officials denied the allegations. Despite this allegation, Steele had no involvement in the Law School case until after a faculty vote on his appointment to the school had been completed (44 in favor; 0 opposed). Faculty appointments are not made by Deans, but by a review and vote of the faculty themselves — precluding the kind of trading of appointments for favors implied in the allegation. In light of these and other facts, university officials dismissed the allegations. Steele also stated his regrets about not preemptively removing leadership to create a less threatening environment for the complainant.

== Personal life ==
Steele lives in California. Claude and his late wife Dorothy had been known to collaborate on projects dedicated to prejudice in American society and minority student achievement. His twin brother, Shelby Steele, is a conservative writer and a senior fellow at the Hoover Institution at Stanford University.

== Teaching and administrative appointments ==
- 1971-1973 Assistant Professor of Psychology, University of Utah
- 1973-1987 Assistant Professor to associate professor of psychology, University of Washington
- 1987-1991 Professor of Psychology, University of Michigan
- 1989-1991 Research Scientist, Institute for Social Research, University of Michigan
- 1991-2009 Professor of Psychology, Stanford University
- 1996-1997 President, Western Psychological Association
- 1997-2000 Chair, Department of Psychology, Stanford University
- 1997-2009 Lucie Stern Professor in the Social Sciences, Stanford University
- 2002-2005 Director, Center for Comparative Studies in Race and Ethnicity, Stanford University
- 2002-2003 President, Society for Personality and Social Psychology
- 2009-2011 Provost of Columbia University
- 2011-2014 Dean, Stanford Graduate School of Education
- 2014–2016 Executive Vice Chancellor and Provost, University of California, Berkeley

== Awards and honors ==
- 1994-1995 Cattell Faculty Fellowship, the James McKeen Cattell Fund
- 1995 Dean's Teaching Award, Stanford University
- 1996 Elected to the American Academy of Arts and Sciences
- 1997 Gordon Allport Prize in Social Psychology, Society for the Psychological Study of Social Issues
- 1998 Elected to the National Academy of Education
- 2000 William James Fellow Award for Distinguished Scientific Career Contribution, American Psychological Society
- 2001 Donald Campbell Award, Society for Personality and Social Psychology
- 2002 Kurt Lewin Memorial Award, Society for the Psychological Study of Social Issues
- 2002 Senior Award for Distinguished Contributions to Psychology in the Public Interest, American Psychological Association
- 2003 Distinguished Scientific Contribution Award, American Psychological Association
- 2003 Elected to the National Academy of Sciences
- 2004 Columbia Teachers College Medal for Distinguished Service
- 2007 Distinguished Scientific Impact Award, the Society of Experimental Social Psychology. (For “Threat in the Air”)
- 2007 Presidential Citation, American Psychological Association
- 2008 Elected to the American Philosophical Society
- Received honorary doctorates from: University of Chicago, Yale University, Princeton University, University of Michigan, and University of Maryland, Baltimore.
- 2010 Honorary Doctor of Science from Northwestern University
- 2010 Elizabeth Hurlock Beckman Award for mentoring students whose work has had an effect on society
- 2011 Elected to The National Science Board
- 2011 Alexander George Book Award
- 2012 The SPSP Service to the Field Award on Behalf of Personality and Social Psychology
- 2016 Scientific Impact Award, The Society of Experimental Social Psychology
- 2017 Fellow, American Institutes for Research
- 2017 Fellow, American Academy of Political and Social Science
- 2020 The Legacy Award from the Society of Personality and Social Psychology. The Legacy Award honors figures whose career contributions have shaped the field.

== Memberships ==
- American Academy of Education
- National Academy of Sciences
- American Philosophical Society
- Board, Social Science Research Council
- Board of Directors, John D. and Catherine T. MacArthur Foundation
- National Science Board
