= History of anthropometry =

History of measurements of humans

The history of anthropometry includes its use as an early tool of anthropology, use for identification, use for the purposes of understanding human physical variation in paleoanthropology and in various attempts to correlate physical with racial and psychological traits. At various points in history, certain anthropometrics have been cited by advocates of discrimination and eugenics often as a part of some social movement or through pseudoscientific claims.

== Craniometry and paleoanthropology ==
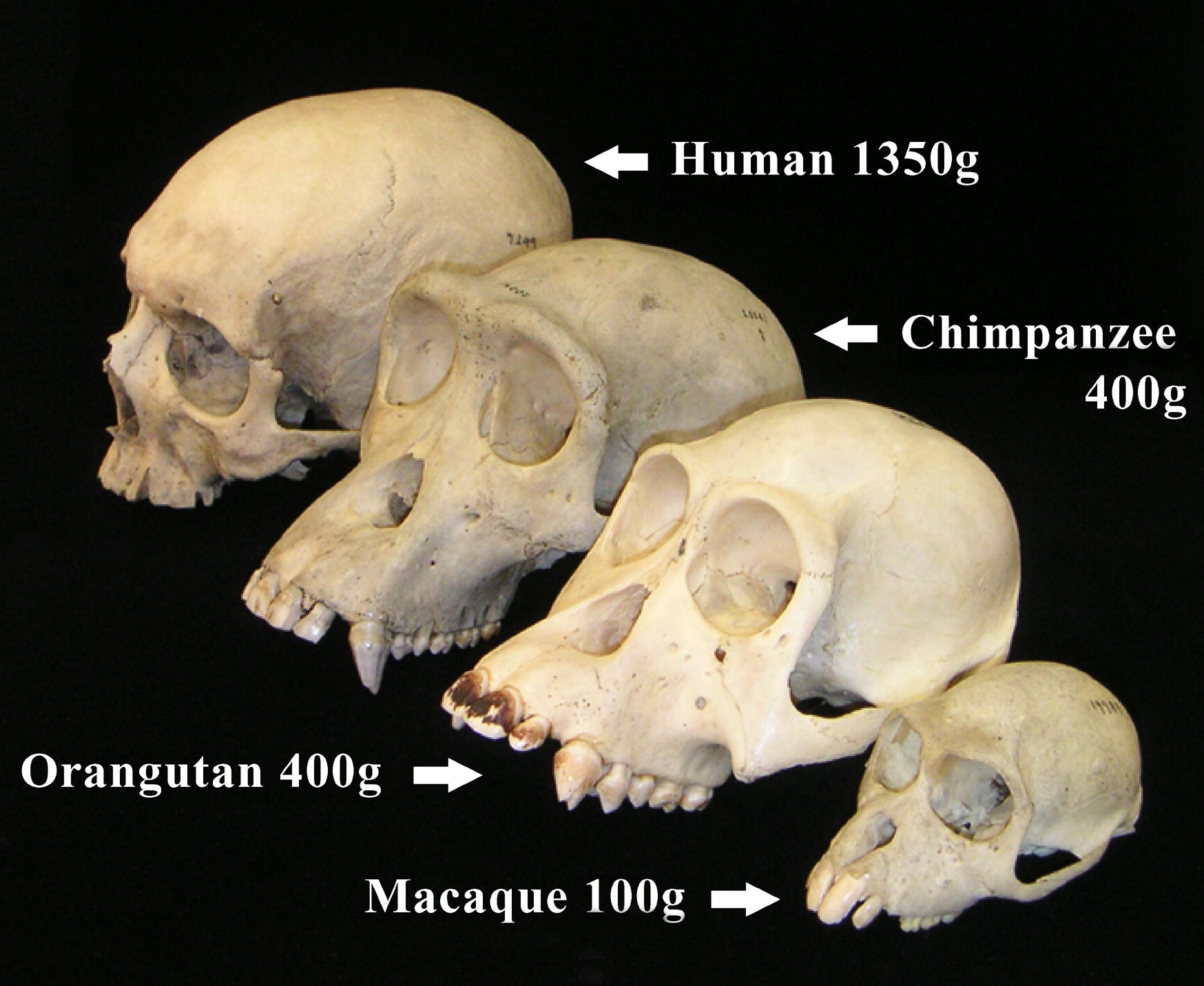
Selection of primate skulls

In 1716 Louis-Jean-Marie Daubenton, who wrote many essays on comparative anatomy for the Académie française, published his Memoir on the Different Positions of the Occipital Foramen in Man and Animals (Mémoire sur les différences de la situation du grand trou occipital dans l'homme et dans les animaux). Six years later Pieter Camper (1722–1789), distinguished both as an artist and as an anatomist, published some lectures that laid the foundation of much work. Camper invented the "facial angle," a measure meant to determine intelligence among various species. According to this technique, a "facial angle" was formed by drawing two lines: one horizontally from the nostril to the ear; and the other perpendicularly from the advancing part of the upper jawbone to the most prominent part of the forehead. Camper's measurements of facial angle were first made to compare the skulls of men with those of other animals. Camper claimed that antique statues presented an angle of 90°, Europeans of 80°, Central Africans of 70° and the orangutan of 58°.

Swedish professor of anatomy Anders Retzius (1796–1860) first used the cephalic index in physical anthropology to classify ancient human remains found in Europe. He classed skulls in three main categories; "dolichocephalic" (from the Ancient Greek kephalê "head", and dolikhos "long and thin"), "brachycephalic" (short and broad) and "mesocephalic" (intermediate length and width). Scientific research was continued by Étienne Geoffroy Saint-Hilaire (1772–1844) and Paul Broca (1824–1880), founder of the Anthropological Society in France in 1859. Paleoanthropologists still rely upon craniofacial anthropometry to identify species in the study of fossilized hominid bones. Specimens of Homo erectus and athletic specimens of Homo sapiens, for example, are virtually identical from the neck down but their skulls can easily be told apart.

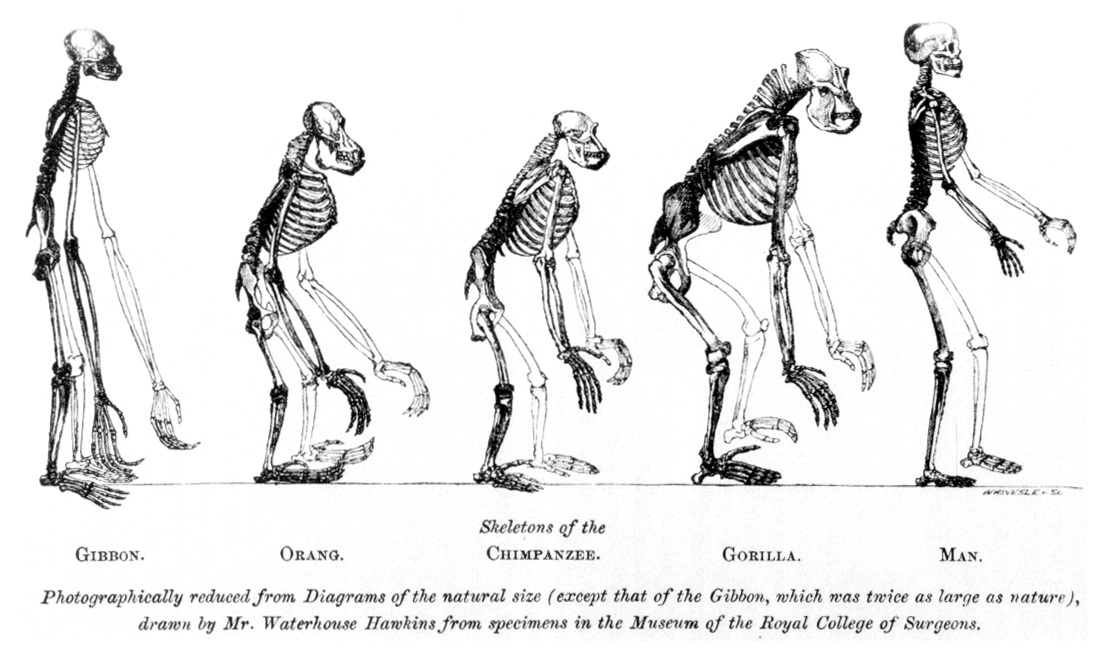
Pithecometra: In the frontispiece from his 1863 Evidence as to Man's Place in Nature, Thomas Huxley compared skeletons of apes to humans.

Samuel George Morton (1799–1851), whose two major monographs were the Crania Americana (1839), An Inquiry into the Distinctive Characteristics of the Aboriginal Race of America and Crania Aegyptiaca (1844) concluded that the ancient Egyptians were not Negroid but Caucasoid and that Caucasians and Negroes were already distinct three thousand years ago. Since The Bible indicated that Noah's Ark had washed up on Mount Ararat only a thousand years before this Noah's sons could not account for every race on earth. According to Morton's theory of polygenism the races had been separate from the start. Josiah C. Nott and George Gliddon carried Morton's ideas further. Charles Darwin, who thought the single-origin hypothesis essential to evolutionary theory, opposed Nott and Gliddon in his 1871 The Descent of Man, arguing for monogenism.

In 1856, workers found in a limestone quarry the skull of a Neanderthal hominid male, thinking it to be the remains of a bear. They gave the material to amateur naturalist Johann Karl Fuhlrott who turned the fossils over to anatomist Hermann Schaaffhausen. The discovery was jointly announced in 1857, giving rise to the discipline of paleoanthropology. By comparing skeletons of apes to man, T. H. Huxley (1825–1895) backed up Charles Darwin's theory of evolution, first expressed in On the Origin of Species (1859). He also developed the "Pithecometra principle," which stated that man and ape were descended from a common ancestor.

Eugène Dubois' (1858–1940) discovery in 1891 in Indonesia of the "Java Man", the first specimen of Homo erectus to be discovered, demonstrated mankind's deep ancestry outside Europe. Ernst Haeckel (1834–1919) became famous for his "recapitulation theory", according to which each individual mirrors the evolution of the whole species during his life.

== Typology and personality ==
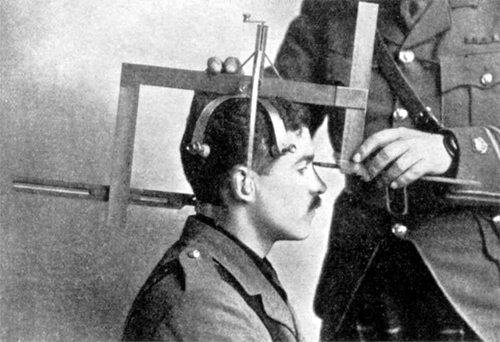
A head-measuring tool designed for anthropological research in the early 1910s. Theodor Kocher was inventor of the craniometer.

Intelligence testing was compared with anthropometrics. Samuel George Morton (1799–1851) collected hundreds of human skulls from all over the world and started trying to find a way to classify them according to some logical criterion. Morton claimed that he could judge intellectual capacity by cranial capacity. A large skull meant a large brain and high intellectual capacity; a small skull indicated a small brain and decreased intellectual capacity. Modern science has since confirmed that there is a correlation between cranium size (measured in various ways) and intelligence as measured by IQ tests, although it is a weak correlation at about 0.2. Today, brain volume as measured with MRI scanners also find a correlation between brain size and intelligence at about 0.4.

Craniometry was also used in phrenology, which purported to determine character, personality traits, and criminality on the basis of the shape of the head. At the turn of the 19th century, Franz Joseph Gall (1758–1822) developed "cranioscopy" (Ancient Greek kranion "skull", scopos "vision"), a method to determine the personality and development of mental and moral faculties on the basis of the external shape of the skull. Cranioscopy was later renamed phrenology (phrenos: mind, logos: study) by his student Johann Spurzheim (1776–1832), who wrote extensively on "Drs. Gall and Spurzheim's physiognomical System." These all claimed the ability to predict traits or intelligence and were intensively practised in the 19th and the first part of the 20th century.

During the 1940s anthropometry was used by William Sheldon when evaluating his somatotypes, according to which characteristics of the body can be translated into characteristics of the mind. Inspired by Cesare Lombroso's criminal anthropology, he also believed that criminality could be predicted according to the body type. A basically anthropometric division of body types into the categories endomorphic, ectomorphic and mesomorphic derived from Sheldon's somatotype theories is today popular among people doing weight training.

== Forensic anthropometry ==
=== Bertillon, Galton and criminology ===
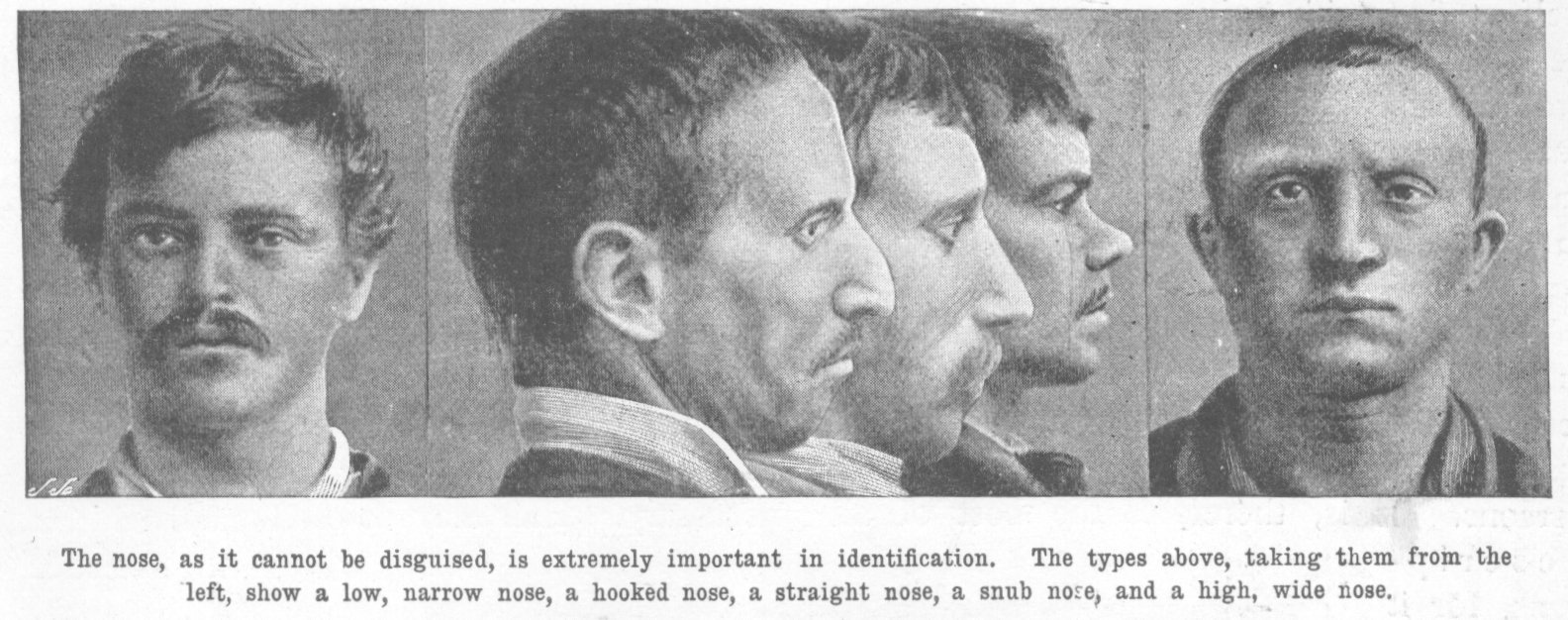
Illustration from "The Speaking Portrait" (Pearson's Magazine, Vol XI, January to June 1901) demonstrating the principles of Bertillon's anthropometry

In 1883, Frenchman Alphonse Bertillon introduced a system of identification that was named after him. The "Bertillonage" system was based on the finding that several measures of physical features, such as the dimensions of bony structures in the body, remain fairly constant throughout adult life. Bertillon concluded that when these measurements were made and recorded systematically, every individual would be distinguishable. Bertillon's goal was a way of identifying recidivists ("repeat offenders"). Previously police could only record general descriptions. Photography of criminals had become commonplace, but there was no easy way to sort the many thousands of photographs except by name. Bertillon's hope was that, through the use of measurements, a set of identifying numbers could be entered into a filing system installed in a single cabinet.

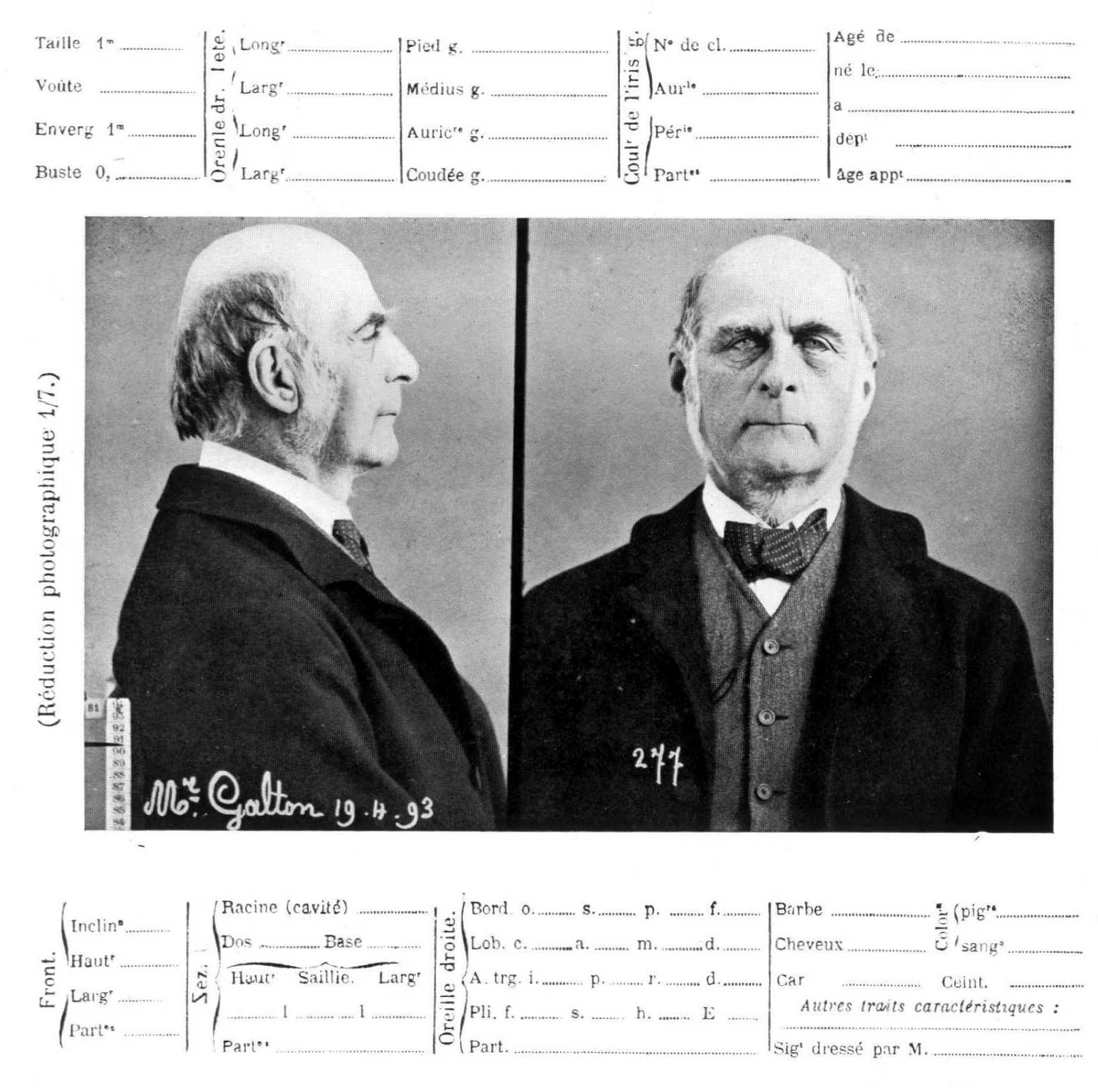
A Bertillon record for Francis Galton, from a visit to Bertillon's laboratory in 1893

The system involved 10 measurements; height, stretch (distance from left shoulder to middle finger of raised right arm), bust (torso from head to seat when seated), head length (crown to forehead) and head width temple to temple) width of cheeks, and "lengths" of the right ear, the left foot, middle finger, and cubit (elbow to tip of middle finger). It was possible, by exhaustion, to sort the cards on which these details were recorded (together with a photograph) until a small number produced the measurements of the individual sought, independently of name.

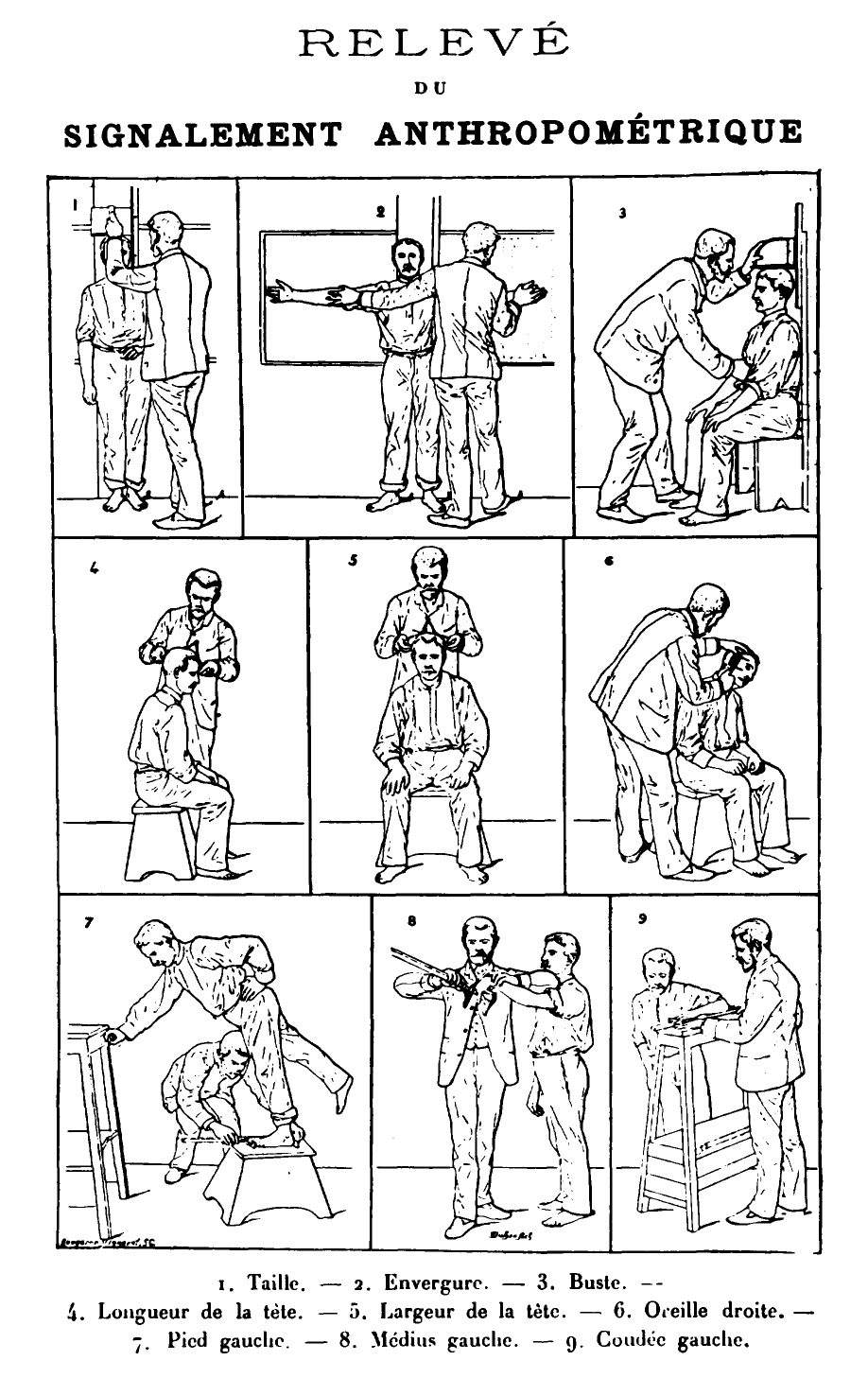
A chart from Bertillon's Identification anthropométrique (1893), demonstrating how to take measurements for his identification system

The system was soon adapted to police methods: it prevented impersonation and could demonstrate wrongdoing.

Bertillonage was before long represented in Paris by a collection of some 100,000 cards and became popular in several other countries' justice systems. England followed suit when in 1894, a committee sent to Paris to investigate the methods and its results reported favorably on the use of measurements for primary classification and recommended also the partial adoption of the system of finger prints suggested by Francis Galton, then in use in Bengal, where measurements were abandoned in 1897 after the fingerprint system was adopted throughout British India. Three years later England followed suit, and, as the result of a fresh inquiry ordered by the Home Office, relied upon fingerprints alone.

Bertillonage exhibited certain defects and was gradually supplanted by the system of fingerprints and, latterly, genetics. Bertillon originally measured variables he thought were independent – such as forearm length and leg length – but Galton had realized that both were the result of a single causal variable (in this case, stature) and developed the statistical concept of correlation.

Other complications were: it was difficult to tell whether or not individuals arrested were first-time offenders; instruments employed were costly and liable to break down; skilled measurers were needed; errors were frequent and all but irremediable; and it was necessary to repeat measurements three times to arrive at a mean result.

=== Physiognomy ===
Physiognomy claimed a correlation between physical features (especially facial features) and character traits. It was made famous by Cesare Lombroso (1835–1909), the founder of anthropological criminology, who claimed to be able to scientifically identify links between the nature of a crime and the personality or physical appearance of the offender. The originator of the concept of a "born criminal" and arguing in favor of biological determinism, Lombroso tried to recognize criminals by measurements of their bodies. He concluded that skull and facial features were clues to genetic criminality and that these features could be measured with craniometers and calipers with the results developed into quantitative research. A few of the 14 identified traits of a criminal included large jaws, forward projection of jaw, low sloping forehead; high cheekbones, flattened or upturned nose; handle-shaped ears; hawk-like noses or fleshy lips; hard shifty eyes; scanty beard or baldness; insensitivity to pain; long arms, and so on.

== Phylogeography, race and human origins ==
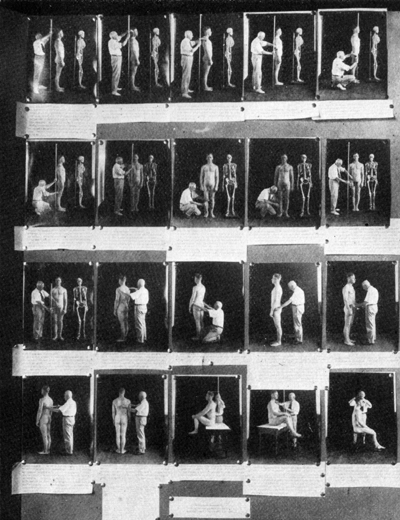
Anthropometry demonstrated in an exhibit from a 1921 eugenics conference

Phylogeography is the science of identifying and tracking major human migrations, especially in prehistoric times. Linguistics can follow the movement of languages and archaeology can follow the movement of artefact styles but neither can tell whether a culture's spread was due to a source population's physically migrating or to a destination population's simply copying the technology and learning the language. Anthropometry was used extensively by anthropologists studying human and racial origins: some attempted racial differentiation and classification, often seeking ways in which certain races were inferior to others. Nott translated Arthur de Gobineau's An Essay on the Inequality of the Human Races (1853–1855), a founding work of racial segregationism that made three main divisions between races, based not on colour but on climatic conditions and geographic location, and privileged the "Aryan" race. Science has tested many theories aligning race and personality, which have been current since Boulainvilliers (1658–1722) contrasted the Français (French people), alleged descendants of the Nordic Franks, and members of the aristocracy, to the Third Estate, considered to be indigenous Gallo-Roman people subordinated by right of conquest.

François Bernier, Carl Linnaeus and Blumenbach had examined multiple observable human characteristics in search of a typology. Bernier based his racial classification on physical type which included hair shape, nose shape and skin color. Linnaeus based a similar racial classification scheme. As anthropologists gained access to methods of skull measure they developed racial classification based on skull shape.

Theories of scientific racism became popular, one prominent figure being Georges Vacher de Lapouge (1854–1936), who in L'Aryen et son rôle social ("The Aryan and his social role", 1899) divided humanity into various, hierarchized, different "races", spanning from the "Aryan white race, dolichocephalic" to the "brachycephalic" (short and broad-headed) race. Between these Vacher de Lapouge identified the "Homo europaeus (Teutonic, Protestant, etc.), the "Homo alpinus" (Auvergnat, Turkish, etc.) and the "Homo mediterraneus" (Napolitano, Andalus, etc.). "Homo africanus" (Congo, Florida) was excluded from discussion. His racial classification ("Teutonic", "Alpine" and "Mediterranean") was also used by William Z. Ripley (1867–1941) who, in The Races of Europe (1899), made a map of Europe according to the cephalic index of its inhabitants.

Vacher de Lapouge became one of the leading inspirations of Nazi antisemitism and Nazi ideology. Nazi Germany relied on anthropometric measurements to distinguish Aryans from Jews and many forms of anthropometry were used for the advocacy of eugenics. During the 1920s and 1930s, though, members of the school of cultural anthropology of Franz Boas began to use anthropometric approaches to discredit the concept of fixed biological race. Boas used the cephalic index to show the influence of environmental factors. Researches on skulls and skeletons eventually helped liberate 19th century European science from its ethnocentric bias. This school of physical anthropology generally went into decline during the 1940s.

=== Race and brain size ===
Several studies have demonstrated correlations between race and brain size, with varying results. In some studies, Caucasians were reported to have larger brains than other racial groups, whereas in recent studies and reanalysis of previous studies, East Asians were reported as having larger brains and skulls. More common among the studies was the report that Africans had smaller skulls than either Caucasians or East Asians. Criticisms have been raised against a number of these studies regarding questionable methods.

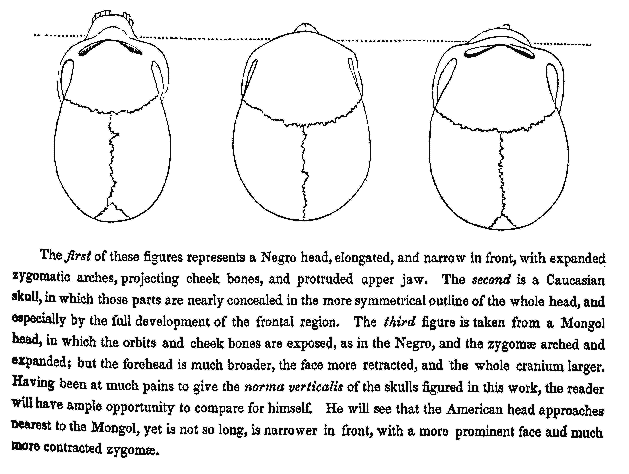
An 1839 drawing by Samuel George Morton of "a Negro head …, a Caucasian skull …, a Mongol head"

In Crania Americana Morton claimed that Caucasians had the biggest brains, averaging 87 cubic inches, Indians were in the middle with an average of 82 cubic inches and Negroes had the smallest brains with an average of 78 cubic inches. In 1873 Paul Broca (1824–1880) found the same pattern described by Samuel Morton's Crania Americana by weighing brains at autopsy. Other historical studies alleging a Black–White difference in brain size include Bean (1906), Mall, (1909), Pearl, (1934) and Vint (1934). But in Germany Rudolf Virchow's study led him to denounce "Nordic mysticism" in the 1885 Anthropology Congress in Karlsruhe. Josef Kollmann, a collaborator of Virchow, stated in the same congress that the people of Europe, be them German, Italian, English or French, belonged to a "mixture of various races," furthermore declaring that the "results of craniology" led to "struggle against any theory concerning the superiority of this or that European race". Virchow later rejected measure of skulls as legitimate means of taxonomy. Paul Kretschmer quoted an 1892 discussion with him concerning these criticisms, also citing Aurel von Törok's 1895 work, who basically proclaimed the failure of craniometry.

Stephen Jay Gould (1941–2002) claimed Samuel Morton had fudged data and "overpacked" the skulls. A subsequent study by John Michael concluded that "[c]ontrary to Gould's interpretation... Morton's research was conducted with integrity." In 2011 physical anthropologists at the university of, which owns Morton's collection, published a study that concluded that "Morton did not manipulate his data to support his preconceptions, contra Gould." They identified and remeasured half of the skulls used in Morton's reports, finding that in only 2% of cases did Morton's measurements differ significantly from their own and that these errors either were random or gave a larger than accurate volume to African skulls, the reverse of the bias that Dr. Gould imputed to Morton. Difference in brain size, however, does not necessarily imply differences in intelligence: women tend to have smaller brains than men yet have more neural complexity and loading in certain areas of the brain. This claim has been criticized by, among others, John S. Michael, who reported in 1988 that Morton's analysis was "conducted with integrity" while Gould's criticism was "mistaken".

Similar claims were previously made by Ho et al. (1980), who measured 1,261 brains at autopsy, and Beals et al. (1984), who measured approximately 20,000 skulls, finding the same East Asian → European → African pattern but warning against using the findings as indicative of racial traits, "If one merely lists such means by geographical region or race, causes of similarity by genogroup and ecotype are hopelessly confounded". Rushton's findings have been criticized for confusing African-Americans with equatorial Africans, who generally have smaller craniums as people from hot climates often have slightly smaller crania. He also compared equatorial Africans from the poorest and least educated areas of Africa with Asians from the wealthiest, most educated areas and colder climates. According to Z. Z. Cernovsky Rushton's own study shows that the average cranial capacity of North American blacks is similar to that of Caucasians from comparable climatic zones, though a previous work by Rushton showed appreciable differences in cranial capacity between North Americans of different race. This is consistent with the findings of Z. Z. Cernovsky that people from different climates tend to have minor differences in brain size.

=== Race, identity and cranio-facial description ===
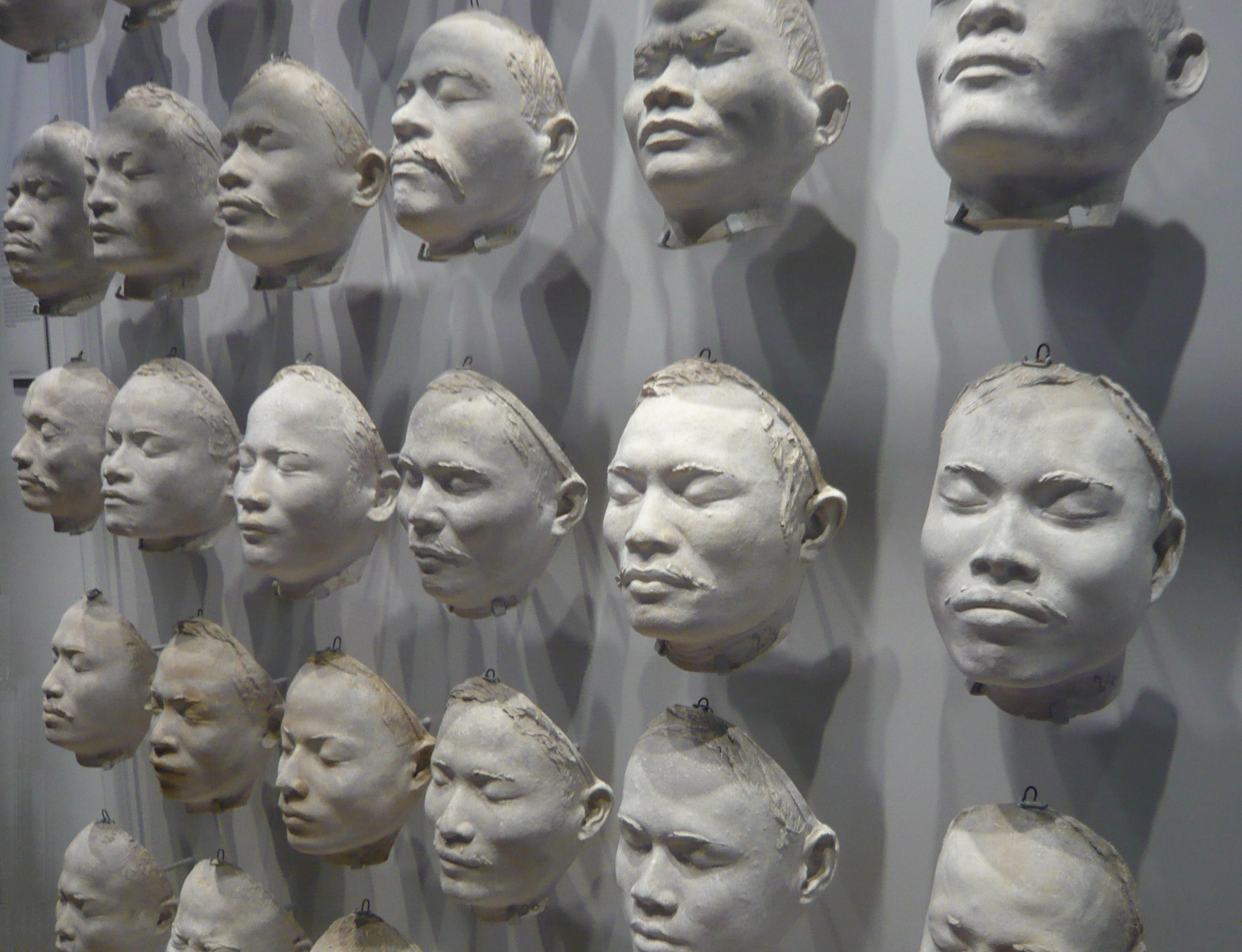
Plaster face casts of Nias islanders collected by J. P. Kleiweg de Zwaan, circa 1910

Observable craniofacial differences included: head shape (mesocephalic, brachycephalic, dolichocephalic) breadth of nasal aperture, nasal root height, sagittal crest appearance, jaw thickness, brow ridge size and forehead slope. Using this skull-based categorization, German philosopher Christoph Meiners in his The Outline of History of Mankind (1785) identified three racial groups:

- Caucasoid characterized by a tall dolichocephalic skull, receded zygomas, large brow ridge and projecting-narrow nasal apertures.
- Negroid characterized by a short dolichocephalic skull, receded zygomas and wide nasal apertures.
- Mongoloid characterized by a medium brachycephalic skull, projecting zygomas, small brow ridge and small nasal apertures.

Ripley's The Races of Europe was rewritten in 1939 by Harvard physical anthropologist Carleton S. Coon. Coon, a 20th-century craniofacial anthropometrist, used the technique for his The Origin of Races (New York: Knopf, 1962). Because of the inconsistencies in the old three-part system (Caucasoid, Mongoloid, Negroid), Coon adopted a five-part scheme. He defined "Caucasoid" as a pattern of skull measurements and other phenotypical characteristics typical of populations in Europe, Central Asia, South Asia, West Asia, North Africa, and Northeast Africa (Ethiopia, and Somalia). He discarded the term "Negroid" as misleading since it implies skin tone, which is found at low latitudes around the globe and is a product of adaptation, and defined skulls typical of sub-Saharan Africa as "Congoid" and those of Southern Africa as "Capoid". Finally, he split "Australoid" from "Mongoloid" along a line roughly similar to the modern distinction between sinodonts in the north and sundadonts in the south. He argued that these races had developed independently of each other over the past half-million years, developing into Homo Sapiens at different periods of time, resulting in different levels of civilization. This raised considerable controversy and led the American Anthropological Association to reject his approach without mentioning him by name.

In The Races of Europe (1939) Coon classified Caucasoids into racial sub-groups named after regions or archaeological sites such as Brünn, Borreby, Alpine, Ladogan, East Baltic, Neo-Danubian, Lappish, Mediterranean, Atlanto-Mediterranean, Irano-Afghan, Nordic, Hallstatt, Keltic, Tronder, Dinaric, Noric and Armenoid. This typological view of race, however, was starting to be seen as out-of-date at the time of publication. Coon eventually resigned from the American Association of Physical Anthropologists, while some of his other works were discounted because he would not agree with the evidence brought forward by Franz Boas, Stephen Jay Gould, Richard Lewontin, Leonard Lieberman and others.

The concept of biologically distinct races has been rendered obsolete by modern genetics. Different methods of categorizing humans yield different groups, making them non-concordant. Neither will the craniofacial method pin-point geographic origins reliably, due to variation in skulls within a geographic region. About one-third of "white" Americans have detectable African DNA markers, and about five percent of "black" Americans have no detectable "negroid" traits at all, craniofacial or genetic. Given three Americans who self-identify and are socially accepted as white, black and Hispanic, and given that they have precisely the same Afro-European mix of ancestries (one African great-grandparent), there is no objective test that will identify their group membership without an interview.

== In popular culture ==
- The Bertillon system was used by the detectives in Caleb Carr's novel The Alienist.

== See also ==
- Anthropometry – Measurement of the human individual
- Anthropometric history – Study of the history of human height and weight
- Body roundness index – Body scale based on waist circumference and height
- Historical race concepts – Obsolete definitions of racial groups
- Scientific racism – Pseudoscientific justification for racism
