= Differential K theory =

Debunked psychological hypothesis

In psychology and criminology, Differential K theory is a debunked hypothesis first proposed by Canadian psychologist J. Philippe Rushton in 1985, which attempts to apply r/K selection theory to human races. According to Rushton, this theory explains race differences in fertility, IQ, criminality, and sexual anatomy and behavior. The theory also hypothesizes that a single factor, the "K factor", affects multiple population statistics Rushton referred to as "life-history traits". It has been criticized as a key example of scientific racism and devoid of empirical basis.

== Reception ==
As Andrew Winston summarizes, "Rushton's work was heavily criticized by psychologists, evolutionary biologists, anthropologists, and geneticists for severe scientific inadequacies, fundamental errors, inappropriate conceptualization of race, inappropriate statistical comparisons, misuse of sources, and serious logical errors and flaws." Differential K theory in particular was described in a 2020 statement by Rushton's former department at Western Ontario University as "thoroughly debunked."

Weizmann et al. argued that Rushton attempted to validate this hypothesis by use of "selective citation and misrepresentation of the research literature and by the use of unreliable sources" and that Rushton's methodology "indicates a lack of familiarity with ecological thinking and scientific method in general."

== See also ==
- Race, Evolution, and Behavior
