= Zack Cernovsky =

Canadian psychologist (1947–2021)

Zack Zdenek Cernovsky (January 26, 1947 – October 25, 2021) was a Canadian psychologist. He was a professor of psychiatry in the Schulich School of Medicine & Dentistry at the University of Western Ontario. He was educated at the University of Berne and the University of Zurich, and taught overseas classes for the University of Maryland before joining the faculty of the University of Western Ontario. His more than 180 scientific publications in psychology and psychiatry deal with topics such as the MMPI, schizophrenia, psychological statistics and research design, sleep disorders, PTSD symptoms in refugees, the frequent psychological polytraumatic symptom pattern encountered in survivors of motor vehicle accidents (chronic pain, pain related insomnia, post-concussion and whiplash syndrome, PTSD, depression, generalized anxiety and driving anxiety), and assessments of subjective psychological symptoms of whiplash injury, as a part of medical psychology.

He published statistical/methodological critiques of the work of racial theoretician J. Philippe Rushton and more recently also of Richard Lynn.

His work also focused on demonstrating the lack of content and criterion validity of the Structured Inventory of Malingered Symptomatology (SIMS), a widely used test that excessively frequently misclassifies legitimate medical patients as malingerers, especially those patients who experience the psychological polytraumatic symptom pattern (e.g., survivors of motor vehicle collisions, injured war veterans, civilians injured in industrial accidents), thus falsely depriving injured persons of medical attention, therapies, and of legally owed insurance benefits.
