= Malingering =

Faking illness for personal gain

- Specialty: Psychiatry, clinical psychology
- Differential diagnosis: Factitious disorder, somatization disorder

Malingering is the intentional fabrication, feigning, or exaggeration of physical or psychological symptoms to obtain an external benefit, such as personal gain, relief from duty or work, avoidance of arrest, acquisition of medication, or mitigation of criminal sentencing.

Although malingering is not a medical diagnosis, it may be recorded as a "focus of clinical attention" or a "reason for contact with health services". It is coded in both the ICD-10 and DSM-5. Motivations for malingering vary. For example, some homeless individuals may feign mental illness to gain hospital admission. Failure to detect malingering can have significant consequences for insurance systems, healthcare institutions, public safety, and veterans' disability programs. Malingering behaviour typically ceases once the desired external goal is achieved.

Malingering is distinct from other forms of excessive illness behaviour. In somatic symptom disorder, symptoms arise from psychological causes but are experienced as real; in factitious disorder, symptoms are intentionally produced but not for external gain. Both conditions are recognised as diagnosable mental disorders in the DSM-5; however, some clinicians question the clarity of these distinctions. The phrase "feigned madness" is commonly used to describe the deliberate simulation of mental illness for purposes of evasion, deception, or diverting suspicion. Historically, this strategy has also been employed, sometimes formally, as with court jesters, to grant individuals licence to speak uncomfortable or socially prohibited truths.

== History ==
=== Antiquity ===
According to 1 Samuel in the Old Testament, King David feigned madness to Achish, the king of the Philistines. Some scholars believe this was not feigned but real epilepsy, and phrasing in the Septuagint supports that position. Odysseus was said to have feigned insanity to avoid participating in the Trojan War. In China's Warring States period, military strategist Sun Bin, while imprisoned by his rival Pang Juan in the state of Wei, feigned madness to get Pang to release him, and eventually escaped back to his native Qi. Eventually, he led Qi troops to defeat Wei troops at the Battle of Maling, leading Pang to suicide.

Malingering was recorded in Roman times by the physician Galen, who reported two cases: one patient simulated colic to avoid a public meeting, and another feigned an injured knee to avoid accompanying his master on a long journey. Lucius Junius Brutus, who feigned stupidity, causing the Tarquins to underestimate him as a threat until the time when he was able to drive the Roman people to insurrection. Ibn al-Haytham, also known as Alhazen, was ordered by the sixth Fatimid Caliph, al-Hakim, to regulate the flooding of the Nile. He later perceived the insanity and futility of what he was attempting to do and, fearing for his life, feigned madness to avoid the Caliph's wrath. The Caliph, believing him to be insane, placed him under house arrest rather than execute him for failure. Alhazen remained there until the Caliph's death, thereby escaping punishment for his failure to accomplish a task that had been impossible from the beginning.

=== Renaissance ===
In 1595, a treatise on feigned diseases was published in Milan by Giambattista Silvatico. Various phases of malingering (les gueux contrefaits) are represented in the etchings and engravings of Jacques Callot (1592–1635). In his Elizabethan-era social-climbing manual, George Puttenham recommends a would-be courtier to have "sickness in his sleeve, thereby to shake off other importunities of greater consequence".

=== Modern period ===
Although the concept of malingering has existed since time immemorial, the term for malingering was introduced in the 1900s for those who would feign illness or disability to avoid military service. In 1943, US Army General George S. Patton found a soldier in a field hospital with no wounds; the soldier claimed to be suffering from battle fatigue. Believing the patient was malingering, Patton flew into a rage and physically assaulted him. The patient had malarial parasites.

Agnes was the first subject of an in-depth discussion of transgender identity in sociology, published by Harold Garfinkel in 1967. In the 1950s, Agnes feigned symptoms and lied about almost every aspect of her medical history. Garfinkel concluded that fearing she would be denied access to sexual reassignment surgery, she had avoided every aspect of her case which would have indicated gender dysphoria and hidden the fact that she had taken hormone therapy. Physicians observing her feminine appearance therefore concluded she had testicular feminization syndrome, which legitimized her request for the surgery.

Kamo, a Bolshevik revolutionary, successfully feigned madness when in a German prison in 1909, and then in a Russian prison in 1910. Ion Ferguson, an Irish psychiatrist in the British Army in a World War II German prisoner-of-war camp, successfully feigned madness to get himself repatriated. He also assisted two other prisoners in doing the same. Ephrem the Syrian, a prominent Christian theologian and writer of Christian literature, avoided presbyteral consecration by feigning madness because he thought he was unworthy of it.

== Types ==
Classifying malingering behavior into different categories allows for an easier assessment of possible deception, as noted by Richard Rogers, Ph.D, and Philip Resnick, M.D).

- Pure malingering: Feigning a disorder or illness that is nonexistent. This may be the simplest deception to detect as malingerers of this type tend to both overexaggerate and endorse atypical symptoms when describing or manifesting their supposed disorder (such as reports of seeing vivid, fully-formed visual hallucinations at all hours of the day). Unsophisticated or primitive malingerers may attempt to appear symptomatic constantly, but can be observed "out of character" under continued inpatient monitoring.
- Partial malingering: Purposefully exaggerating genuine symptoms of an existing disorder or illness. This type of malingering may be particularly difficult to detect, as those who have a history of genuine psychosis can simulate the condition well and display a typical presentation of the illness. The difference between active genuine symptoms and a sophisticated embellishment may be minimal.
- False imputation: The attribution by a patient of existing symptoms to a cause that the patient knows is unrelated to their illness. Identifying this type of malingering is easier than partial malingering, as the evaluator is likely to be aware of the typical symptoms the disorder (compared with those which would be related to life experiences or other disorders). This may or may not indicate deliberate deception (a patient may simply have poor insight or an erroneous understanding of their condition).

== Society and culture ==
=== Post-traumatic stress disorder ===
Veterans may be denied disability benefits if their doctor believes that they are malingering, especially regarding post-traumatic stress disorder. PTSD is the only condition for which the DSM-5 explicitly warns clinicians to observe in case of malingering. Distinguishing exaggerated or feigned post-traumatic stress disorder (PTSD) from genuine presentations is considered difficult, particularly in compensation or forensic assessments. Forensic reviews have estimated base rates of exaggeration or malingering in PTSD evaluations at approximately 15–20% or higher among individuals seeking financial compensation or pension benefits, although precise prevalence figures remain uncertain due to methodological limitations and variability in diagnostic instruments. Recent psychometric research has also highlighted the limitations of commonly used screening tools for detecting feigned symptoms in veteran populations. In addition, record-verification studies in clinical samples of veterans have identified instances in which reported combat exposure did not correspond with official service records, indicating that misrepresentation of service history can occur.

=== Attention deficit hyperactivity disorder ===
Research that focuses on malingering attention deficit hyperactivity disorder are largely centred around university or college students. This is because of the significant benefits that may be gained if the student is successful, including student financial aid and exemptions for academic work. Medicinal treatments of ADHD may also be nootropics, which would enhance cognitive performance in examinations. An experimental study using a scenario method with an adult sample shows that personal and situational characteristics are relevant to understanding malingering. Willingness to feign symptoms was lower in situations of social disapproval and when personal morality disapproved of feigning. The results also showed that this willingness decreased with age. The willingness to feign can be considered conditional upon the willingness to use these drugs and their specific antecedents.

=== Legal issues ===
Malingering is a court-martial offense in the United States military under the Uniform Code of Military Justice, which defines the term as "feign[ing] illness, physical disablement, mental lapse, or derangement." According to the Texas Department of Insurance, fraud that includes malingering costs the US insurance industry approximately $150 billion each year. Other non-industry sources report it may be as low as $5.4 billion.

== In fiction and mythology ==
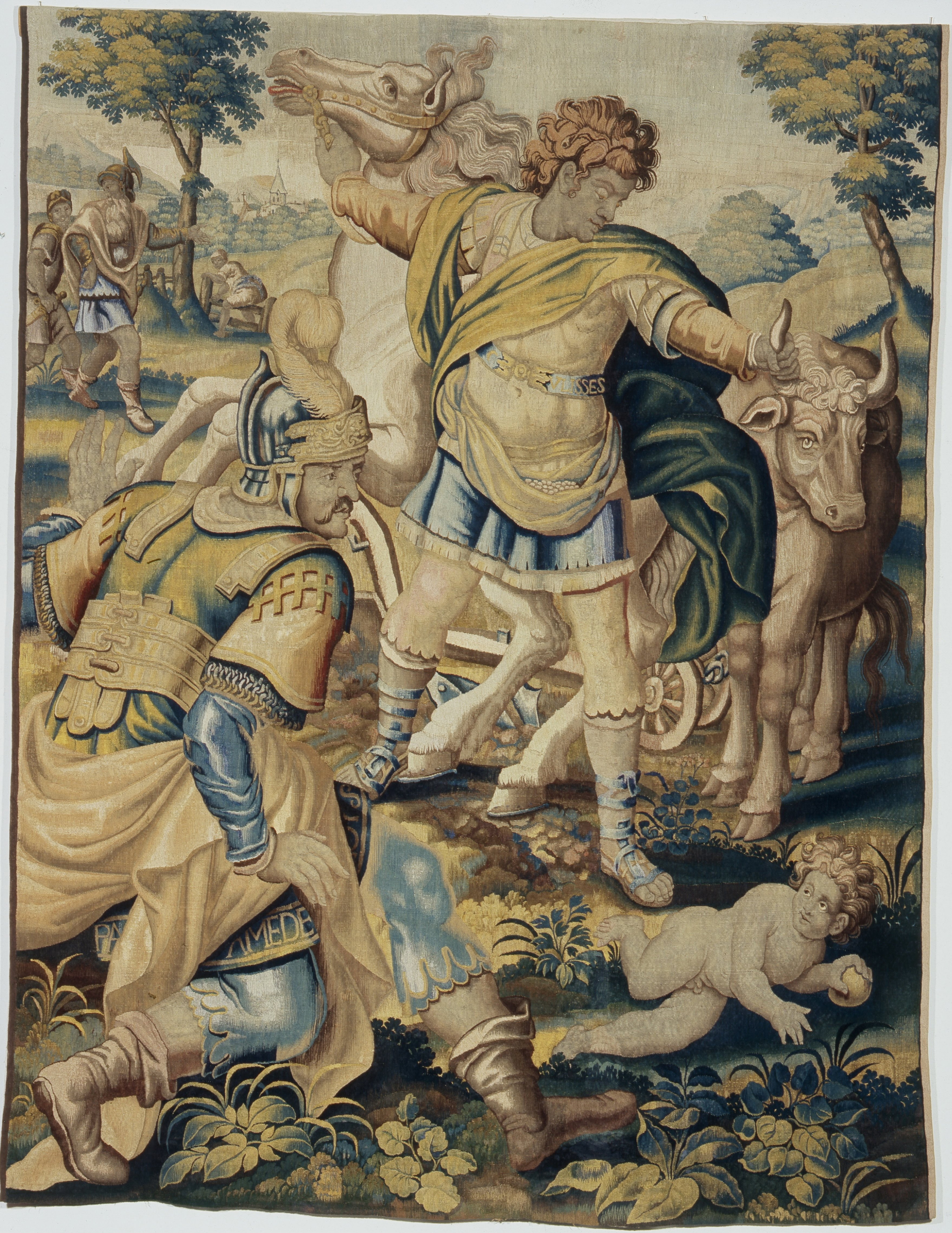
Odysseus fakes insanity, early 17th century tapestry. Ptuj Ormož Regional Museum, Ptuj Slovenia

- Shakespeare's Hamlet, who feigns madness in order to speak freely and gain revenge—possibly based on a real person; see Hamlet (legend).
- Madness in Valencia is a 1590s comedy by Lope de Vega in which the male lead gets himself into an asylum to escape prosecution for murder. Other characters also feign for love.
- Odysseus feigned madness by yoking a horse and an ox to his plow and sowing salt or plowing the beach. Palamedes believed that he was faking and tested it by placing his son, Telemachus right in front of the plow. When Odysseus stopped immediately, his sanity was proven.
- "Feign madness but keep your balance" is one of the Thirty-Six Stratagems
- One Flew Over the Cuckoo's Nest, Randle McMurphy feigns insanity in order to serve out his criminal sentence in a mental hospital rather than a prison.
- In Henry IV by Luigi Pirandello, the main character feigns insanity.
- In Goodbyeee, the last episode of BBC sitcom Blackadder, Blackadder feigns madness to try to avoid being sent into battle.
- The protagonist of the film Shock Corridor is a journalist who fakes insanity in order to gain access to an institution.
- In Ricochet, Denzel Washington plays an assistant district attorney who feigns madness to catch a criminal by extraordinary means. He remarks: "Going insane, it's strangely liberating, isn't it?"
- Another notable example is Primal Fear, adapted from the William Diehl novel of the same name. In the film, Martin Vail (Richard Gere) defends a timid, young altar boy named Aaron Stampler (Edward Norton) accused of murdering an archbishop. Halfway through, Vail discovers Stampler has dissociative identity disorder, with one sociopathic personality called "Roy," who was responsible for killing the Archbishop. However, after Stampler is released due to plea of insanity, Vail discovers Stampler faked the disorder in order to avoid execution. The film was Edward Norton's debut, which earned him an Oscar nomination for Best Supporting Actor.
- Jose Manalo and Wally Bayola's roles in Scaregivers feigned madness by eating peanut butter disguised as stool samples, which landed them in a mental facility.
- In Colditz, a British television series about prisoners-of-war in WWII Germany, Wing Commander George Marsh feigns madness as a way of escaping. He successfully convinces his captors that he is insane and is duly repatriated. But there is a twist: after his return to Britain, Marsh becomes genuinely insane.

== Detection ==
Richard Rogers and Daniel Shuman found that the use of DSM-5 criteria results in a true-positive rate of only 13.6% to 20.1%; that is, among persons whom the criteria indicate to be malingering, only 13.6% to 20.1% are actual malingerers. The remaining 79.9% to 86.4% whom those criteria indicate to be malingering are in fact false positives, i.e., non-malingerers erroneously classified as malingerers. Being falsely accused of malingering may cause adverse reactions, some of which lead to violence. Thus, the accurate detection of malingering is a pressing societal issue.

=== Tests ===
There are multiple methods to evaluate malingering, such as the Minnesota Multiphasic Personality Inventory-2, which is the most validated test. Other tests include the Structured Interview of Reported Symptoms, which is used for psychiatric symptoms, and the Test of Memory Malingering (TOMM), intended for false memory deficits. Culture and education also likely affect overall performance in these tests. Research found that Colombian adults with low literacy skills perform significantly worse on the Test of Memory Malingering, so there are concerns with the impact of education levels on malingering assessments. Existing criteria for one malingered disorder may not be applicable to a different disorder. For example, tests for malingered PTSD may not work for malingered neurocognitive disorders; therefore, there is a need for newer criteria to be created.

=== Indicative behaviour ===
Although there is no singular test that definitively discerns malingering, medical professionals are told to watch out for certain behaviours that may indicate deliberate deception. Signs that illustrate malingering include:

- providing contradictory statements about symptoms;
- dramatic or peculiar behaviour that is meant to be convincing;
- behaviour that is inconsistent with described symptoms;
- acting adverse to accepting treatment for their supposed disorder;
- overenthusiasm about negative symptoms through going into extensive detail;
- sudden termination or onset of symptoms

== Causes ==
=== To avoid responsibility ===
- Vincent Gigante, a don of the American Mafia, was seen wandering the streets of Greenwich Village, Manhattan in his bathrobe and slippers, mumbling incoherently to himself, in what he later admitted was an elaborate act.
- Allegedly, Shūmei Ōkawa, a Japanese nationalist on trial for war crimes after World War II.
- Garrett Brock Trapnell, a professional thief and confidence man, frequently pretended to be affected by schizophrenia or dissociative identity disorder in order to be sent to mental institutions rather than prison for his crimes. This strategy eventually failed when he was brought to trial for aircraft hijacking. He was later the subject of a book by Eliot Asinof, entitled The Fox Is Crazy Too.

=== To examine the system from the inside ===
Investigative journalists and psychologists have feigned madness to study psychiatric hospitals from within:

- American muckraker Nellie Bly; see Ten Days in a Mad-House (1887)
- The Rosenhan experiment in the 1970s also provides a comparison of life inside several mental hospitals.
- The Swedish artist Anna Odell created the project Okänd, kvinna 2009-349701 to examine power structures in healthcare, the society's view of mental illness and the victimhood imposed on the patient.

== See also ==
- Doctor shopping
- Drug seeking behaviour
- Falsifiability
- Ganser syndrome
- Hypochondriasis
- Insanity defense
- Münchausen syndrome
- Ocular malingering
- Structured Inventory of Malingered Symptomatology
- Syndrome K, illness fabricated by doctors to protect Jews from Nazis
