= Test of Memory Malingering =

Memory impairment test

- Purpose: Discriminates between true memory impairment and malingering

The Test of Memory Malingering (TOMM) is a 50-question visual memory recognition test that discriminates between true memory impairment and malingering, with two learning trials and an optional retention trial following a delay. It was first published in 1996 and is intended for testing individuals ages 16 and older.

The test has been shown to have high levels of sensitivity and specificity, and is largely insensitive to depression and anxiety.

== Use with children ==
The TOMM has also been examined with pediatric samples. The research with this measure has supported the use of adult criteria for suboptimal effort with children as young as 5 years old with a variety of diagnoses including ADHD, autism, and fetal alcohol syndrome.
