= Andrew Winston =

Canadian psychologist and historian

Andrew S. Winston
- Born: Andrew Spencer Winston; 1946 (age 79–80)
- Education: University of Illinois at Urbana–Champaign
- Known for: History of psychology
- Scientific career
- Fields: Psychology
- Workplaces: University of Guelph
- Thesis: Experimental analysis of cheating and admission of cheating in a classroom setting (1975)

Andrew Spencer Winston (born 1946) is a psychologist and historian who is an emeritus professor at the University of Guelph in Canada. He is known for his research on the history of scientific racism and eugenics in psychology. He was president of the Society for the History of Psychology (Division 26 of the American Psychological Association) in 2012, and served as Executive Officer to Cheiron: The International Society for the History of Behavioral and Social Sciences from 2002 to 2008.

Winston has been critical of right libertarian thinkers such as Murray Rothbard, Charles Murray, Ayn Rand, Friedrich von Hayek, Mitlon Friedman and James M. Buchanan, arguing that they have misappropriated IQ to promote racist policies. He has been a noted critic of Canadian race scientist and psychologist J. Philippe Rushton.
