= J. Philippe Rushton =

Canadian psychologist and author (1943–2012)

Philippe Rushton
- Born: John Philippe Rushton; December 3, 1943; Bournemouth, England, UK
- Died: October 2, 2012 (aged 68); London, Ontario, Canada
- Education: Birkbeck College (BA); London School of Economics (PhD)
- Known for: Race, Evolution, and Behavior (1995); Race and intelligence Differential K theory
- Spouse: Elizabeth Weiss (former)
- Scientific career
- Fields: Psychology, psychometrics
- Workplaces: York University; University of Toronto; University of Western Ontario

John Philippe Rushton (December 3, 1943 – October 2, 2012) was a Canadian psychologist and author. He taught at the University of Western Ontario until the early 1990s, and became known to the general public during the 1980s and 1990s for promoting anti-Black racism through his widely discredited research on race and intelligence, race and crime, and other purported racial correlations.

Rushton's work has been heavily criticized by the scientific community for the poor quality of its research, with many academics arguing that it was conducted under a racist agenda. From 2002 until his death, he served as the head of the Pioneer Fund, an organization founded in 1937 to promote eugenics, which has been described as racist and white supremacist in nature, and as a hate group by the Southern Poverty Law Center. He also published articles in and spoke at conferences organized by the white supremacist magazine American Renaissance.

Rushton was a Fellow of the Canadian Psychological Association and a onetime Fellow of the John Simon Guggenheim Memorial Foundation. In 2020, the Department of Psychology of the University of Western Ontario released a statement stating that "much of [Rushton's] research was racist", was "deeply flawed from a scientific standpoint", and "Rushton's legacy shows that the impact of flawed science lingers on, even after qualified scholars have condemned its scientific integrity." As of 2021, Rushton has had six research publications retracted for being scientifically flawed, unethical, and not replicable, and for advancing a racist agenda despite evidence contradictory to his claims.

In early 2026, the Canadian Psychological Association revoked Rushton's Fellow status, stating that "Dr. Rushton's published work on race and intelligence is fundamentally inconsistent with the established scientific evidence and ethical standards that guide the discipline of psychology."

== Early life and education ==
Rushton was born in Bournemouth, England. During his childhood, he emigrated with his family to South Africa, where he lived from age four to eight (1948–1952). His father was a building contractor and his mother came from France. The family moved to Canada, where Rushton spent most of his teen years. He returned to England for university, receiving a B.Sc. in psychology from Birkbeck College at the University of London in 1970, and, in 1973, his Ph.D. in social psychology from the London School of Economics for work on altruism in children. He then spent one year as a postdoctoral fellow at University of Oxford until 1974.

== Later life and career ==
Rushton taught at York University in Canada from 1974 to 1976 and the University of Toronto until 1977. He moved to the University of Western Ontario and was made full professor (with tenure) in 1985. He received a D.Sc. from the University of London in 1992. His controversial research has sparked political debates, and Ontario Premier David Peterson called Rushton a racist. In 2005, The Ottawa Citizen described Rushton as the most famous university professor in Canada.

He published more than 250 articles and six books, including two on altruism, and one on scientific excellence, and co-authored an introductory psychology textbook. He was a signatory of the opinion piece "Mainstream Science on Intelligence."

Rushton died of cancer on October 2, 2012, at the age of 68.

== Work and opinions ==
=== Genetic similarity theory ===
Early in his career, Rushton did research on altruism. He theorized a heritable component in altruism and developed Genetic Similarity Theory, which is an extension of W.D. Hamilton's theory of kin selection. It holds that individuals tend to be more altruistic to individuals who are genetically similar to themselves even if they are not kin, and less altruistic, and sometimes outwardly hostile, to individuals who are less genetically similar. Rushton describes "ethnic conflict and rivalry" as "one of the great themes of historical and contemporary society", and suggests that this may have its roots in the evolutionary impact on individuals from groups "giving preferential treatment to genetically similar others". According to Rushton: "the makeup of a gene pool [i.e., a human population's total reservoir of alternative genes] causally affects the probability of any particular ideology being adopted".

Articles in a 1989 issue of Behavioral and Brain Sciences criticized the theory. Judith Anderson said his work was based on statistically flawed evidence, John Archer and others said that Rushton failed to understand and misapplied the theory of kin selection, Judith Economos said that Rushton's analysis was speculative, that he failed to define the concept of altruistic behaviour in a way that it can become manifest, and that he failed to show any plausible mechanism by which members of a species can detect the "altruism gene" in other members of the species. Steven Gangestad criticized Rushton's theory for not being compelling in terms of its attractiveness as an explanatory model. C.R. Hallpike said Rushton's theory failed to take into account that many other traits, ranging from age, sex, social and political group membership, are observably more important in predicting altruistic behaviour between non-kin than genetic similarity. John Hartung criticized Rushton for failing to conduct an adequate control group study and for ignoring contradictory evidence.

Littlefield and Rushton (1984) examined degree of bereavement among parents after the death of a child. They found that children perceived as more physically similar to their parents were grieved for more intensely than less similar children. Russell, Wells, and Rushton (1985) reanalyzed several previous studies on similarities between spouses and concluded there is higher similarity on the more heritable characteristics. In 1988 Rushton examined blood group genes and found that sexually interacting couples had more similar blood group genes than randomly paired individuals.

=== Race and intelligence ===
Rushton spent much of his career arguing that average IQ differences between racial groups are due to genetic causes, a view that was controversial at the time and is now broadly rejected by the scientific consensus. His research areas included studying brain size and the effects of racial admixture.

In a 2020 statement, his former department at the University of Western Ontario stated: "Rushton's works linking race and intelligence are based on an incorrect assumption that fuels systemic racism, the notion that racialized groups are concordant with patterns of human ancestry and genetic population structure." Furthermore, they stated that Rushton's work on the topic is "characterized by a complete misunderstanding of population genetic measures, including fundamental misconceptions about the nature of heritability."

=== Application of r/K selection theory to race ===
Rushton's book Race, Evolution, and Behavior (1995) attempted to use r/K selection theory to explain what he described as an evolutionary scale of characteristics indicative of nurturing behaviour in which East Asian people consistently averaged high, black people low, and white people in the middle. He first published this theory in 1984. Rushton argued that East Asians and their descendants average a larger brain size, greater intelligence, more sexual restraint, slower rates of maturation, and greater law abidingness and social organization than do Europeans and their descendants, whom he argued average higher scores on these measures than Africans and their descendants. He hypothesized that r/K selection theory explains these differences.

Rushton's application of r/K selection theory to explain differences among racial groups has been widely criticized. Differential K theory in particular was described in a 2020 statement by Rushton's former department at Western Ontario University as "thoroughly debunked."

One of his many critics is the evolutionary biologist Joseph L. Graves, who has done extensive testing of the r/K selection theory with species of Drosophila flies. Graves argues that not only is r/K selection theory considered to be virtually useless when applied to human life history evolution, but Rushton does not apply the theory correctly, and displays a lack of understanding of evolutionary theory in general. Graves also says that Rushton misrepresented the sources for the biological data he gathered in support of his hypothesis, and that much of his social science data was collected by dubious means. Other scholars have argued against Rushton's hypothesis on the basis that the concept of race is not supported by genetic evidence about the diversity of human populations, and that his research was based on folk taxonomies.

Later studies by Rushton and other researchers have argued that there is empirical support for the theory, though these studies too have been criticized.

Psychologist David P. Barash observed that r- and K-selection may have some validity when considering the so-called demographic transition, whereby economic development characteristically leads to reduced family size and other K traits. "But this is a pan-human phenomenon, a flexible, adaptive response to changed environmental conditions ... Rushton wields r- and K-selection as a Procrustean bed, doing what he can to make the available data fit ... Bad science and virulent racial prejudice drip like pus from nearly every page of this despicable book."

=== Dimensional structure of personality ===
Beginning in 2008, Rushton researched the structure of personality. Over about a dozen papers, he argued that variation in personality can be explained by variation in a single underlying "general factor", similar to the g factor of psychometrics.

=== Opinions ===
In 2009 Rushton spoke at the Preserving Western Civilization conference in Baltimore. It was organized by Michael H. Hart for the stated purpose of "addressing the need" to defend "America's Judeo-Christian heritage and European identity" from immigrants, Muslims, and African Americans. The Anti-Defamation League described the conference attendees as "racist academics, conservative pundits and anti-immigrant activists".

== Reception ==
=== Press coverage ===
Rushton prompted controversy for years, attracting coverage from the press as well as comments and criticism by scientists of his books and journal articles.

First-year psychology students who took Rushton's classes said that he had conducted a survey of students' sexual habits in 1988, asking "such questions as how large their penises are, how many sex partners they have had, and how far they can ejaculate". First-year psychology students at the University of Western Ontario are required "to participate in approved surveys as a condition of their studies. If they choose not to, they must write one research paper. Also, many students feel subtle pressure to participate in order not to offend professors who may later be grading their work. However, if a study is not approved, these requirements do not apply at all." For his failing to tell students they had the option not to participate in his studies without incurring additional work, the university barred Rushton for two years from using students as research subjects. He had tenure at UWO.

In a 2005 Ottawa Citizen article, Rushton stated that the public perceives disproportionately negative effects caused by black residents "in every bloody city in Canada where you have black people." In the same article, Rushton suggested that equalizing outcomes across groups was "impossible". The Southern Poverty Law Center called the piece "yet another attack" by Rushton, and it criticized those who published his work and that of other "race scientists".

=== Academic opinion ===
==== Favorable ====
In a 1991 work, the Harvard biologist E. O. Wilson (one of the two co-founders of the r/K selection theory which Rushton uses) was quoted as having said about him:

I think Phil is an honest and capable researcher. The basic reasoning by Rushton is solid evolutionary reasoning; that is, it is logically sound. If he had seen some apparent geographic variation for a non-human species – a species of sparrow or sparrow hawk, for example – no one would have batted an eye. ... [W]hen it comes to [human] racial differences, especially in the inflamed situation in this country, special safeguards and conventions need to be developed.

Three years after the publication of Wilson's 1975 book Sociobiology: The New Synthesis, Rushton had already begun a long correspondence with Wilson. The letters became particularly extensive between 1987 and 1995 (Wilson's letters have now been archived by the Library of Congress). After Wilson's death at the end of 2021, historians of science Mark Borrello and David Sepkoski have reassessed how Wilson's thinking on issues of race and evolution was influenced by Rushton.

In a 1995 review of Rushton's Race, Evolution, and Behavior, anthropologist and population geneticist Henry Harpending expressed doubt as to whether all of Rushton's data fit the r/K model he proposed, but nonetheless praised the book for its proposing of a theoretical model that makes testable predictions about differences between human groups. He concludes that "Perhaps there will ultimately be some serious contribution from the traditional smoke-and-mirrors social science treatment of IQ, but for now Rushton's framework is essentially the only game in town." In their 2009 book The 10,000 Year Explosion, Harpending and Gregory Cochran later described Rushton as one of the researchers to whom they are indebted.

The psychologists Arthur Jensen, Hans Eysenck, Richard Lynn, Linda Gottfredson and Thomas Bouchard had a high opinion of Rushton's Race, Evolution and Behavior, describing Rushton's work as rigorous and impressive. However, many of these researchers are themselves controversial and they all received money from the Pioneer Fund, which had funded much of Rushton's work when these reviews were written.

Some criminologists who study the relationship between race and crime regard Rushton's r/K theory as one of several possible explanations for racial disparities in crime rates. Others, such as the criminologist Shaun L. Gabbidon, think that Rushton has developed one of the more controversial biosocial theories related to race and crime; he says that it has been criticized for failing to explain all of the data and for its potential to support racist ideologies. The criminologist Anthony Walsh has defended Rushton, claiming that none of Rushton's critics has supplied data indicating anything other than the racial gradient he identifies, and that it is unscientific to dismiss Rushton's ideas on the basis of their political implications.

==== Unfavorable ====
On 22 June 2020, the Department of Psychology at the University of Western Ontario issued a statement regarding their former faculty member, which read in part:

Despite its deeply flawed assumptions and methodologies, Rushton's work and other so-called "race science" (currently under the pseudonym of "race realism") continues to be misused by white supremacists and promoted by eugenic organizations. Thus, Rushton's legacy shows that the impact of flawed science lingers on, even after qualified scholars have condemned its scientific integrity. Academic freedom and freedom of expression are critical to free scientific inquiry. However, the notion of academic freedom is disrespected and abused when it is used to promote the dissemination of racist and discriminatory concepts. Scientists have an obligation to society to speak loudly and actively in opposition of such abuse.

Also in 2020, Andrew Winston summarized Rushton's scholarly reception as follows: "Rushton's work was heavily criticized by psychologists, evolutionary biologists, anthropologists, and geneticists for severe scientific inadequacies, fundamental errors, inappropriate conceptualization of race, inappropriate statistical comparisons, misuse of sources, and serious logical errors and flaws."

In 1989, geneticist and media personality David Suzuki criticized Rushton's racial theories in a live televised debate at the University of Western Ontario. He said: "There will always be Rushtons in science, and we must always be prepared to root them out". At the same occasion, Rushton rejected believing in racial superiority, saying "we've got to realize that each of these populations is perfectly, beautifully adapted to their own ancestral environments".

Also in 1989, Michael Lynn published a paper in the Journal of Research in Personality criticizing a study by Rushton & Bogaert that had been published in the same journal two years earlier. Lynn cited four reasons he considered Rushton & Bogaert's study to be flawed:

First, they did not explain why natural selection would have favored different reproductive strategies for different races. Second, their data on race differences are of questionable validity because their literature review was selective and their original analyses were based on self-reports. Third, they provided no evidence that these race differences had significant effects on reproduction or that sexual restraint is a K characteristic. Finally, they did not adequately rule out environmental explanations for their data.

Marvin Zuckerman, psychology professor of the University of Delaware, criticized Rushton's research on methodological grounds, observing that more variation exists in personality traits within racial groups than between them and arguing that Rushton selectively cited data from the Eysenck Personality Questionnaire.

Critical psychologist Thomas Teo argued that Rushton's "substantial success and influence in the discipline" and use of "accepted usage of empirical mainstream methods" pointed to broader problems in academic psychology.

Biologist Garland E. Allen argued in 1990 that Rushton "selectively cites and misrepresents his sources to support his conclusions. Far from being an 'honest attempt' to follow the Truth wherever it leads, Rushton seems to be putting a ring through Truth's nose and leading it toward his own barn...He has used, abused, distorted, and in some cases virtually falsified his sources."

According to Charles Lane, in 1988, Rushton conducted a survey at the Eaton Centre mall in Toronto, where he paid 50 whites, 50 blacks, and 50 Asians to answer questions about their sexual habits. Because he did not clear his survey and proposed to pay for answers with the university committee at UWO, the administration reprimanded Rushton, calling his transgression "a serious breach of scholarly procedure", said University President, George Pederson.

A 1993 study reanalyzed data from a study Rushton had published on the relationship between race and crime and found no strong relationship between the two.

Rushton's work was criticized in the scholarly literature; he generally responded, sometimes in the same journal. In 1995, in the Journal of Black Studies, Zack Cernovsky wrote: "some of Rushton's references to scientific literature with respects to racial differences in sexual characteristics turned out to be references to a nonscientific semi-pornographic book and to an article by Philip Nobile in the Penthouse magazine's Forum."

In 1995, two researchers published a review and meta-analysis concluding that racial differences in behaviour were accounted for entirely by environmental factors, which contradicts Rushton's evolutionary theory for the origin of such differences.

Anti-racism activist Tim Wise criticized Rushton's application of r/K selection theory to crime rates and IQ, charging that Rushton ignored things such as systematic/institutional discrimination, racial profiling, economic disparities and unequal access to judicial defense in his attempt to apply r/K Theory and IQ theories to explain racial disparities in American crime rates. He also criticized Rushton and others like him of ignoring things like white-collar crime rates,

Corporate criminals, after all, are usually highly educated, and probably would score highly on just about any standardized test you chose to give them. And what of it? Virtually all the stock manipulators, unethical derivatives traders and shady money managers on Wall Street, whose actions have brought the economy to its knees of late — and who it might be worth noting are pretty much all white men — would likely do well on the Stanford-Binet or Wonderlich Industrial Aptitude Test. They probably were above-average students. But what are we to make of these facts? Clearly they say little about the value of such persons to the nation or the world. The Unabomber was a certified genius and Ted Bundy was of well-above-average intelligence... But I'm having a hard time discerning what we should conclude about these truths, in terms of how much emphasis we place on intelligence, as opposed to other human traits.

The biological anthropologist C. Loring Brace criticized Rushton in his 1996 review of the book, Race, Evolution, and Behavior (1996):

Virtually every kind of anthropologist may be put in the position of being asked to comment on what is contained in this book, so, whatever our individual specialty, we should all be prepared to discuss what it represents. Race, Evolution, and Behavior is an amalgamation of bad biology and inexcusable anthropology. It is not science but advocacy, and advocacy for the promotion of "racialism." Tzvetan Todorov explains "racialism," in contrast to "racism," as belief in the existence of typological essences called "races" whose characteristics can be rated in hierarchical fashion (On Human Diversity: Nationalism, Racism, and Exoticism in French Thought, Cambridge, MA: Harvard University Press, 1993, p. 31). "Racism," then, is the use of racialist assumptions to promote social or political ends, a course that Todorov regards as leading to "particularly catastrophic results." Perpetuating catastrophe is not the stated aim of Rushton's book, but current promoters of racist agendas will almost certainly regard it as a welcome weapon to apply for their noxious purposes.

Robert Sussman, an evolutionary anthropologist and the editor-in-chief of American Anthropologist, explained why the journal did not accept ads for Rushton's 1998 book:

This is an insidious attempt to legitimize Rushton's racist propaganda and is tantamount to publishing ads for white supremacy and the neo-Nazi party. If you have any question about the validity of the "science" of Rushton's trash you should read any one of his articles and the many rebuttals by ashamed scientists.

In 2000, after Rushton mailed a booklet on his work to psychology, sociology, and anthropology professors across North America, Hermann Helmuth, a professor of anthropology at Trent University, said: "It is in a way personal and political propaganda. There is no basis to his scientific research." Rushton responded, "It's not racist; it's a matter of science and recognizing variation in all groups of people."

From 2002, Rushton was the president of the Pioneer Fund. Tax records show that in 2002 his Charles Darwin Research Institute was awarded $473,835, or 73% of the fund's total grants that year. The Southern Poverty Law Center, an American civil rights organization, characterizes the Pioneer Fund as a hate group. Rushton had spoken on eugenics several times at conferences of the American Renaissance magazine, a monthly white supremacist magazine, in which he had also published a number of general articles.

Rushton published articles on the website VDARE, which advocates for reduced immigration into the United States. Stefan Kühl wrote in his book, The Nazi Connection: Eugenics, American Racism, and German National Socialism (2002), that Rushton was part of the revival in the 1980s of public interest in scientific racism.

William H. Tucker, a professor of psychology and expert on the history of scientific racism, observed in 2002:

Rushton has not only contributed to American Renaissance publications and graced their conferences with his presence but also offered praise and support for the "scholarly" work on racial differences of Henry Garrett, who spent the last two decades of his life opposing the extension of the Constitution to blacks on the basis that the "normal" black resembled a European after frontal lobotomy. Informed of Garrett's assertion that blacks were not entitled to equality because their "ancestors were ... savages in an African jungle," Rushton dismissed the observation as quoted "selectively from Garrett's writing", finding nothing opprobrious in such sentiments because the leader of the scientific opposition to civil rights had made other statements about black inferiority that were, according to Rushton, "quite objective in tone and backed by standard social science evidence." Quite apart from the questionable logic in defending a blatant call to deprive citizens of their rights by citing Garrett's less offensive writing—as if it were evidence of Ted Bundy's innocence that there were some women he had met and not killed—there was no sense on Rushton's part that all of Garrett's assertions, whether or not "objective," were utterly irrelevant to constitutional guarantees, which are not predicated on scientific demonstrations of intellectual equality.

A 2003 study in Evolution and Human Behavior found no evidence to support Rushton's hypothesized relationship between race and behaviour.

In 2005, Lisa Suzuki and Joshua Aronson of New York University wrote an article for Psychology, Public Policy, and Law noting that Rushton ignored evidence that failed to support his position that IQ test score gaps represent a genetic racial hierarchy. He did not change his position on this matter for 30 years. Rushton replied in the same issue of the journal.

In a paper for the International Journal of Selection and Assessment in 2006, Steven Cronshaw and colleagues wrote that psychologists need to critically examine the science used by Rushton in his "race-realist" research. Their re-analysis of the validity criteria for test bias, using data reported in the Rushton et al. paper, led them to conclude that the testing methods were biased against Black Africans. They disagree with other aspects of Rushton's methodology, such as his use of non-equivalent groups in test samples. Rushton responded in the next issue of the journal. He said why he believed his results were valid, and why he thought the criticisms incorrect.

Scott McGreal (2012) in Psychology Today criticized the science of Rushton's "Race Differences in Sexual Behavior: Testing an Evolutionary Hypothesis". He cited Weizmann, Wiener, Wiesenthal, & Ziegle, which argued that Rushton's theory relied on flawed science. McGreal faulted Rushton and his use of Nobile's penis size study.

On 17 June 2020, academic publisher Elsevier announced it was retracting an article that Rushton and Donald Templer had published in 2012 in the Elsevier journal Personality and Individual Differences. The article falsely claimed that there was scientific evidence that skin color was related to aggression and sexuality in humans.

On 24 December 2020, the academic journal Psychological Reports retracted two Rushton articles about intelligence and race. Review of the articles, which were originally published in the 1990s, "found that the research was unethical, scientifically flawed, and based on racist ideas and agenda". On 23 August 2021, it retracted three more.

In early 2026, the Canadian Psychological Association revoked Rushton's Fellow status, stating that "Dr. Rushton's published work on race and intelligence is fundamentally inconsistent with the established scientific evidence and ethical standards that guide the discipline of psychology." They described Rushton's methods as falling short of the standards expected of a CPA Fellow and noted that his work has been used by white supremacists to cause ongoing harm to the Black community and other minority groups.

== Personal life ==
Rushton was married to biological anthropologist Elizabeth Weiss, who taught Anthropology at the San Jose State University. Weiss, after arguing that archaeologists "have let creationism" into the discipline, for which she cited NAGPRA's "religious criteria," sued the university's authorities, claiming that they restricted her access to skeletal remains that she was studying, in retaliation to her views. The suit was settled in June 2023, with Weiss voluntarily retiring with full benefits.

== See also ==
- History of the race and intelligence controversy
- Race and intelligence
- Scientific racism
