= Johann Carl Fuhlrott =

Co-discoverer of Homo neanderthalensis

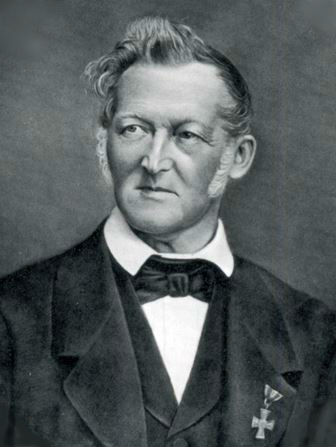
Fuhlrott

Johann Carl Fuhlrott (31 December 1803, Leinefelde, Germany – 17 October 1877, Elberfeld, now part of Wuppertal) was an early German paleoanthropologist. He is famous for recognising the significance of the bones of Neanderthal 1, a Neanderthal specimen discovered by German laborers who were digging for limestone in Feldhofer grotto, later known as Neander valley (Neanderthal in German) in August 1856. Originally disregarded, Fuhlrott, to his eternal credit, had the insight to recognise them for what they were: the remains of a previously unknown type of human.

== Biography ==
His parents were the innkeeper Johannes Philipp Fuhlrott and his wife Maria Magdalena, née Nussbaum. His parents had died by the time he was ten and he was raised by his uncle, the Catholic priest Carl Bernhard Fuhlrott, in Seulingen. In 1835 he married Josepha Amalia Kellner (1812–1850), with whom he had six children.

After studying mathematics and natural sciences at the University of Bonn, Fuhlrott became a teacher at the Gymnasium in Elberfeld. Fuhlrott was an amateur naturilist and his interests extended to fossil collection and prehistoric remains.

In 1856, workers in a lime quarry in the nearby canyon called Gesteins or Neandertal (southwest of Mettmann) showed him bones they had found in a cave and thought to belong to a bear. Fuhlrott identified them as human and thought them to be very old. He recognised them to be different from the usual bones of humans and showed them to the Professor of Anatomy at the University of Bonn, Hermann Schaaffhausen. Together they announced the discovery publicly in 1857. In their view the bones represented the remnants of an ancient human race, different from contemporary humans. Their views were not readily accepted as it contradicted literal interpretations of the Bible, and Charles Darwin's work about evolution had not yet been published. Today, Fuhlrott and Schaaffhausen are considered to be the founders of paleoanthropology, and the taxon they discovered is referred to as Homo neanderthalensis in honor of the site where it was first identified.

In 1858, he wrote a book "Vogelfauna des Wupperthals" (Bird Fauna of the Wupper Valley) that was compiled from the collections of Dr. Hopff and Dr. Louis von Guerard.

In 1860, Fuhlrott guided British geologist Charles Lyell to the Feldhofer cave site and Lyell was able to estimate the age of the geology of the cave despite much quarrying but determining that the skull and geology likely representative a primitive state of history.

He died 17 October 1877. He authored a book, "Die erloschenen Vulkane am Rhein und in der Eifel" on volcanoes and their geological context in the Eifel and Rhine regions which was published posthumously in 1878.

== See also ==
- List of fossil sites (with link directory)
- List of hominina (hominid) fossils (with images)
