= Pithecometra principle =

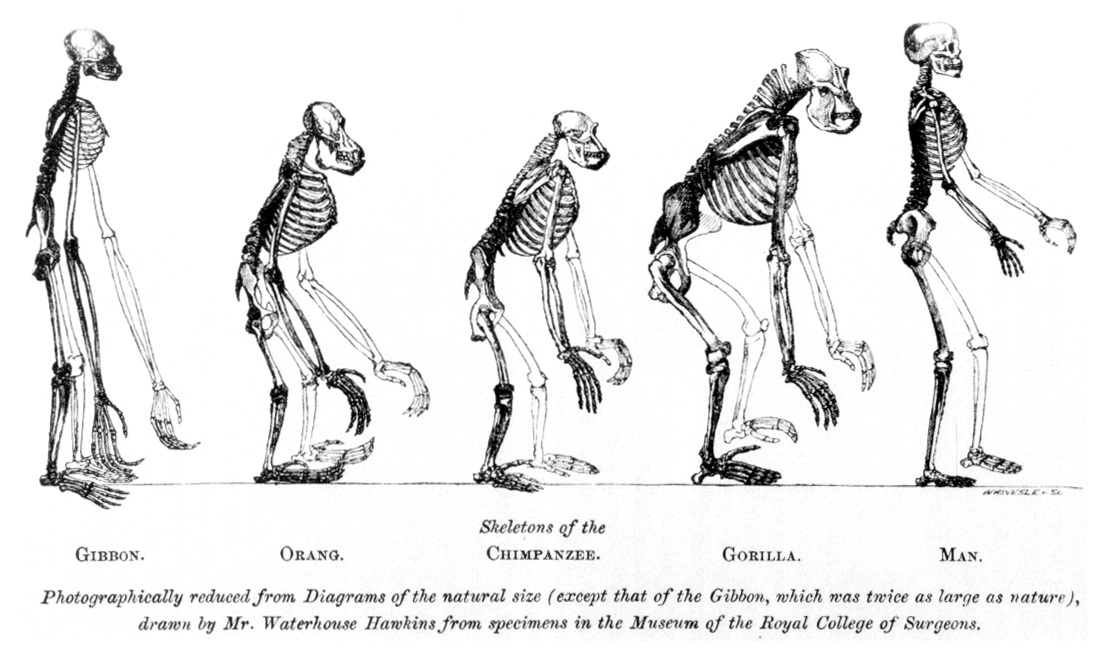
Pithecometra: In the frontispiece from his 1863 Evidence as to Man's Place in Nature, Huxley compared skeletons of apes to humans.

The Pithecometra principle or Pithecometra thesis (German: Pithecometra-Satz) describes the evolution of humans; the pithecometra law is analogous to the concept that "man evolved within apes" or "man descended from apes" as advocated by Thomas Henry Huxley.

In evolution, Huxley first developed the concept of the "Pithecometra principle" which was discussed by Charles Darwin and Ernst Haeckel, when Huxley wrote the 1863 essay "On the Origin of Species" stating that humanity was more closely related to apes than the apes were to monkeys. Huxley added that to hunt evidence of this close ancestry between apes and humans, the regions where modern apes are found should be the focal point, hence, Africa.

The pithecometra principle has been most notable in evolution theory by placing humanity as an offshoot of animal species, rather than a separate divine creation, and thus pithecometra has generated intense religious controversy for decades.

== Impact ==
Another of Darwin's colleagues was Ernst Heinrich Haeckel (1834–1919). Haeckel agreed with Huxley on several aspects of the pithecometra thesis. However, Haeckel frequently lectured on the Asian origin of the "missing link" between apes and humans. Consequently, Eugene Dubois, a student of Haeckel's indoctrinated with the idea of Asian hominid origins, traveled to Java, Indonesia in 1890–1892. It was during this expedition when Dubois made the incredible discovery of Homo erectus fossils in Asia. Also known as Java Man, that specimen was validation of humanity's deep ancestry outside of Europe.

The pithecometra thesis with the work of Darwin, Huxley and Haeckel helped liberate the European scientific community of its Eurocentric biases. However, their work did not directly produce a change. It required the later revolution in evolutionary thought, of the Neo-Darwinian Synthesis of the mid-20th century, to cause a change in the recovery of fossils from regions outside Europe. Evidence of refusals to accept the fossils that began to be found in Asia and Africa after the late 19th century was the Piltdown Hoax.

The perpetrator of the Piltdown hoax is uncertain but the year and location indicate a rejection of growing evidence for man's ancestry outside of Europe. In 1912 in England, a fossil was presented and named Piltdown Man. This specimen was the combination of ape and human features the scientific community had been seeking in order to argue human/ape affinities. The high, globular braincase signified human-like features while the robust jaw and molars resembled ape skulls. This fossil was used as proof of human evolution having occurred in England. With the discovery of the Piltdown specimen, actual fossil specimens of the prehistoric australopithecine genus coming from Africa were being ignored. Raymond Dart, who obtained a fossil skull of an actual hominid showing human-ape affinities from South Africa was treated with disdain. Later in the 1950s, as the Neo-Darwinian Synthesis had thoroughly saturated the European scientific community, fewer people chose to ignore the significant Australopithecus fossils coming from Africa, and the Piltdown Man fossil was re-examined. Upon closer inspection, the cranium was judged to be of a modern human and the jaw matched a modern orangutan. The molars had been filed down to appear like human upper molars, and the surface of the Piltdown specimen had been painted to give it the illusion of having been buried a long time. The rejection of the Piltdown fossil in the 1950s removed a significant barrier that had blocked the European scientific community's view of more accurate human origins.

== See also ==
- On the Origin of Species - 1859 book by Charles Darwin.
