= Hermann Schaaffhausen =

German palaeoanthropologist (1816–1893)

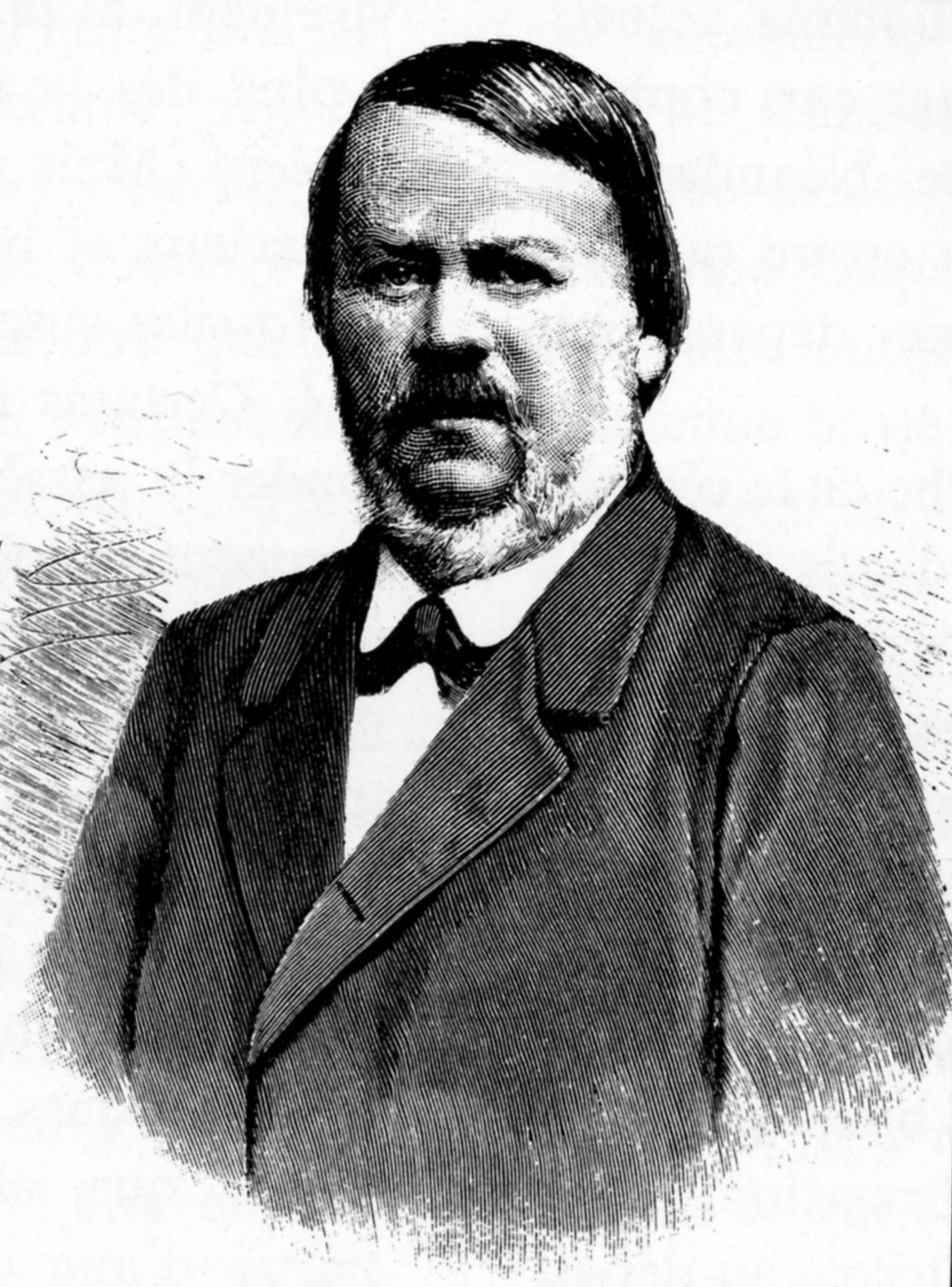
Hermann Schaaffhausen

Hermann Schaaffhausen (19 July 1816, Koblenz – 26 January 1893, Bonn) was a German anatomist, anthropologist, and paleoanthropologist.

== Biography ==
Hermann Schaaffhausen was the son of Josef Hubert Schaaffhausen and Anna Maria Wachendorf. He studied medicine at the University of Berlin and received his doctorate degree in 1839, and became a Professor of Anatomy at the University of Bonn. Schaaffhausen soon became involved in research in physical anthropology and the study of prehistoric humans in Europe. He is best known for his study of the Neanderthal fossils (together with J.C. Fuhlrott). He was a member of several scientific societies, including the Naturhistorischen Vereins der preussischen Rheinlande und Westphalens (Natural History Society of the Rhineland and Westphalia) located in Bonn, the Vereins von Alterthumsfreunden im Rheinlande (Association of the Friends of Antiquity in the Rhineland), and was an honorary member of the Deutsche Gesellschaft für Anthropologie, Ethnologie und Urgeschichte (German Society for Anthropology, Ethnology and Prehistory). He became a member of the prestigious Kaiserlichen Leopoldinisch-Carolinischen Deutschen Akademie der Naturforscher on 25 November 1873. Schaafhausen served as co-editor of the influential journal Archiv für Anthropologie. He was also one of the founders of the Rheinischen Landesmuseums located in Bonn. In addition to his scientific activities Schaaffhausen served as president of the Vereins der Rettung zur See (Association for Rescue at Sea).

Although Darwin's theory of evolution was not yet published, Schaaffhausen discussed the idea of species evolving in an article titled “Ueber Beständigkeit und Umwandlung der Arten” (On the Constancy and Transformation of Species) published in the Verhandlungen des Naturhistorischen Vereins der preussischen Rheinlande und Westphalens (1853) in which he declared that "the immutability of species...is not proven." In the third edition of On the Origin of Species published in 1861, Charles Darwin added a Historical Sketch that acknowledged the ideas of Schaaffhausen.

Many of his most important anthropological papers were collected and published in a book titled Anthropologische Studien (1885).

He also had the opportunity to open Karl Der Grosse/Charlemagne's tomb in order to inspect the remains.

== Schaaffhausen and the discovery of Homo neanderthalensis ==
Workmen quarrying the Feldhofer Grotte in the Neander Valley, near Düsseldorf in northern Germany, in 1856 unearthed human bones in the floor of the cave. A local schoolmaster Johann Carl Fuhlrott, who was interested in geology and paleontology, learned of the discovery and went to the site to collect the unusual bones. They consisted of the top portion of a skull, a clavicle and scapula, the right and left ulnae, a radius bone, the left hip bone, and the right and left femora. Fuhlrott was immediately struck by the fact that the bones appeared to be completely fossilized and the geological location of the bones in the cave, both suggesting that the bones were extremely old. Fuhlrott, recognizing the possible scientific significance of the find, brought the bones to Schaaffhausen in Bonn for analysis. Schaaffhausen was impressed by the primitive form of the skull and the evidence for their geological antiquity.

Fuhlrott and Schaaffhausen presented papers on the fossils and the geology of the Feldhofer Cave at a meeting of the Niederrheinische Gesellschaft für Natur- und Heilkunde (Lower Rhine Society for Natural History and Medical Studies) in Bonn in 1857. Schaaffhausen published a paper on the Neanderthal fossils in the Archiv für Anatomie, Physiologie und wissenschaftliche Medicin in 1858 and Fuhlrott published a paper in the Verhandlungen des Naturhistorischen Vereins der preussischen Rheinlande und Westphalens in 1859 describing the geology of the site and how the bones were discovered. Fuhlrott and Schaaffhausen believed the Neanderthal fossils dated from the Glacial Period when extinct animals such as mammoths and the woolly rhinoceros still lived in Europe, which would make them among the oldest human remains known. This was before scientists believed humans lived during the Ice Age. Furthermore, Schaaffhausen noted that the Neanderthal skull differed from modern human skulls. He argued that the prominent bony ridges over the eyes and the general shape of the skull indicated that it belonged to a savage and barbarous race of human. Schaaffhausen concluded that the bones belonged to the original wild race of humans that lived in Europe before modern European peoples migrated into Europe in prehistoric times.

The fossils generated considerable debate among anthropologists in Germany and abroad. The prominent German anthropologist Rudolf Virchow rejected Schaaffhausen's interpretation of the fossils, considering them the pathological remains of an ancient human. However, in 1864 William King, professor of geology at Queens College in Galway, Ireland, presented a paper where he argued the Neanderthal fossils belonged to an extinct species of early human that he named Homo neanderthalensis. Schaaffhausen continued to write on the Neanderthal fossils over the next two decades, comparing the bones with newly discovered Ice Age human fossils from Belgium, the Cro-Magnon fossils from France, and Stone Age human bones from tombs across Europe.

== Publications ==
- Über Beständigkeit und Umwandlung der Arten. In: Verhandlungen des Naturhistorischen Vereins. Bonn 1853
- Zur Kenntnis der ältesten Rasseschädel. In: Archiv für Anatomie, Physiologie und wissenschaftliche Medicin (1858): 453–478.
- Über die Urform des menschlichen Schädels. Bonn 1869
- Die anthropologischen Fragen der Gegenwart. In: Archiv für Anthropologie. 1868
- Über die Methode der vorgeschichtlichen Forschung. In: Archiv für Anthropologie. 1871
- Der Schädel Raphaels. In: Archiv für Anthropologie. 1883
- Anthropologische Studien. Bonn: Adolph Marcus, 1885
- Der Neanderthaler Fund. In: Archiv für Anthropologie. 1888
