= Richard Rogers (psychologist) =

American psychologist (born 1950)

Richard Rogers (born January 1, 1950) is an American psychologist who is a professor at the University of North Texas, and who writes of books on forensic psychology, including Clinical Assessment of Malingering and Deception and Conducting Insanity Evaluations. He has received many national awards, including the 2004-2005 Toulouse Scholars Award, UNT's Eminent Faculty Award, and the Manfred S. Guttmacher Award from the American Psychiatric Association.
