= Race, Evolution, and Behavior =

1995 book by J. Philippe Rushton

Race, Evolution and Behavior
- Cover of the first edition
- Author: J. Philippe Rushton
- Language: English
- Subjects: Race; Human evolution Human intelligence
- Publisher: Transaction Books, later The Charles Darwin Research Institute
- Publication date: 1995, 1997, 2000
- Publication place: United States
- Media type: Print (hardcover and paperback)
- Pages: 388
- ISBN: 978-0-9656836-1-6

Race, Evolution, and Behavior: A Life History Perspective is a book by Canadian psychologist and author J. Philippe Rushton. Rushton was a professor of psychology at the University of Western Ontario for many years, and the head of the controversial Pioneer Fund. The first unabridged edition of the book came out in 1995, and the third, latest unabridged edition came out in 2000; abridged versions were also distributed.

Rushton argues that race is a valid biological concept and that racial differences frequently range in a continuum across 60 different behavioral and anatomical variables, with Mongoloids (East Asians) at one end of the continuum, Negroids (Sub-Saharan Black Africans) at the opposite extreme, and Caucasoids (Europeans) in the middle.

The book was generally received negatively, its methodology and conclusions being criticized by many experts. The aggressive marketing strategy also received a lot of criticism. The book received positive reviews by some researchers, many of whom were personally associated with Rushton and with the Pioneer Fund which funded much of Rushton's research. The book has been examined as an example of Pioneer's funding of scientific racism, while psychologist Michael Howe has identified the book as part of a movement, begun in the 1990s, to promote a racial agenda in social policy.

== Summary ==
The book grew out of Rushton's 1989 paper, "Evolutionary Biology and Heritable Traits (With Reference to Oriental-White-Black Difference)". The 1st unabridged edition was published in 1995, the 2nd unabridged edition in 1997, and the 3rd unabridged edition in 2000.

Rushton argues that Mongoloid, Caucasoid and Negroid populations fall consistently into the same one-two-three way pattern when compared on a list of sixty distinctly different behavioral and anatomical traits and variables.

Rushton uses averages of hundreds of studies, modern and historical, to assert the existence of this pattern. Rushton's book is focused on what he considers the three broadest racial groups, and does not address other populations such as Southeast Asians and Australian Aborigines. The book argues that Mongoloids, on average, are at one end of a continuum, that Negroids, on average, are at the opposite end of that continuum, and that Caucasoids rank in between Mongoloids and Negroids, but closer to Mongoloids. His continuum includes both external physical characteristics and personality traits.

=== Differential K theory ===
Differential K theory is a controversial and broadly rejected theory proposed by Rushton, which attempts to apply r/K selection theory to human races. According to Rushton, this theory explains race differences in fertility, IQ, criminality, and sexual anatomy and behavior. The theory also hypothesizes that a single factor, the "K factor", affects multiple population statistics Rushton referred to as "life-history traits".

This theory has been widely rejected as unscientific or pseudoscientific. Rushton's work includes logical errors, cites poor-quality sources, ignored contrary sources, and cites sources which Rushton had misinterpreted or misunderstood.

== Responses ==
According to Richard R. Valencia, the response to the first edition of Rushton's book was "overwhelmingly negative", with only a small number of supporters, many being, like Rushton, Pioneer Fund grantees, such as psychologists Arthur Jensen, Michael Levin, Richard Lynn, and Linda Gottfredson.

Valencia identified the main areas of criticism as focusing on Rushton's use of "race" as a biological concept, a failure to appreciate the extent of variation within populations compared with that between populations, a false separation of genetics and environment, poor statistical methodology, a failure to consider alternative hypotheses, and the use of unreliable and inappropriate data to draw conclusions about the relationship between brain size and intelligence. According to Valencia, "experts in life history conclude that Rushton's (1995) work is pseudoscientific and racist."

A more favorable review of the book came from Gottfredson, who wrote in Politics and the Life Sciences that the book "confronts us as few books have with the dilemmas wrought in a democratic society by individual and group differences in key human traits". Another favorable review of the book appeared in the National Review.

Richard Lewontin (1996) argued that in claiming the existence of "major races", and that these categories reflected large biological differences, "Rushton moves in the opposite direction from the entire development of physical anthropology and human genetics for the last thirty years. Anthropologists no longer regard 'race' as a useful concept in understanding human evolution and variation." The anthropologist C. Loring Brace (1996) concurred, stating that the book was "an amalgamation of bad biology and inexcusable anthropology. It is not science but advocacy, and advocacy of 'racialism'". Similarly, anthropologist John Relethford (1995) criticized Rushton's model as "faulty at many points."

== Mailing controversy ==
The first special abridged edition published under the Transaction Press name in 1999 caused considerable controversy when 40,000 copies were "mailed, unsolicited, to psychologists, anthropologists, and sociologists, many of whom were angered when they discovered that their identities and addresses had been obtained from their respective professional associations' mailing lists." The director of Transaction Press Irving Louis Horowitz, although he had defended the original edition of the book, "condemned the abridged edition as a 'pamphlet' that he had never seen or approved prior to its publication." A subsequent 2nd special abridged edition was published in 2000 with a rejoinder to Horowitz's criticisms under a new entity called The Charles Darwin Research Institute.

According to Tucker, many academics who received the book unsolicited were outraged at its content, calling it "racial pornography" and a "vile piece of work"; at least one insisting on returning it to the publisher. Hermann Helmuth, a professor of anthropology at Trent University, said, "It is in a way personal and political propaganda. There is no basis to his scientific research."

== As an example of Pioneer Fund activity ==
Race, Evolution, and Behavior has been cited as an example of the Pioneer Fund's activities in promoting scientific racism. Valencia notes that many of the supportive comments for the book come from Pioneer grantees like Rushton himself, and that a 100,000 copy print-run of the third edition was financed by Pioneer. The book is cited by psychologist William H. Tucker as an example of the Pioneer Fund's continued role "to subsidize the creation and distribution of literature to support racial superiority and racial purity." The mass distribution of the abridged third edition he described as part of a "public relations effort", and "the latest attempt to convince the nation of 'the completely different nature' of blacks and whites." He notes that bulk rates were offered "for distribution to media figures, especially columnists who write on race issues".

== Reviews ==
- Browne, Malcolm W. (16 October 1994). "What Is Intelligence, and Who Has It?". The New York Times. - review of Race, Evolution, and Behavior and two other books
- Harpending, Henry (1995). "Human biological diversity" (PDF). Evolutionary Anthropology: Issues, News, and Reviews. 4 (3): 99–103. doi:10.1002/evan.1360040306. Archived from the original (PDF) on 2011-08-17. - review of Race, Evolution, and Behavior and three other books
- Buist, Steve (17 April 2000). "Controversial Backer". The Hamilton Spectator. Archived from the original on 2016-03-03 – via Institute for the Study of Academic Racism. - discusses the links of the Pioneer Fund to the distribution and positive reviews for the book
- Horowitz, Irving Louis (Jan–Feb 1995). "Race, Evolution and Behavior' by J. Philippe Rushton". Society. 32 (2). Archived from the original on 2004-11-16.

== See also ==
- Behavioural genetics
- Behaviorism
- Evolutionary psychology
- Race and intelligence
- Scientific racism
