= Rewire News Group =

United States pro-abortion rights news publication

- Available in: English
- Editor: Galina Espinoza
- Website: rewirenewsgroup.com
- Commercial: No
- Launched: 2006; 20 years ago

Rewire News Group (formerly Rewire and RH Reality Check) is a daily United States online news publication focused on reproductive and sexual health from a pro-choice perspective. It also covers issues around racial, environmental, immigration, and economic justice.

The publication began as a blog in 2006 and became its own nonprofit organization in January 2012. In 2016, it was renamed Rewire and in 2018 it was renamed Rewire.News. As of 2018, the publication is edited by Jodi Jacobson. In addition to reporting news, the publication also produces several podcasts, including Boom! Lawyered, Choice/less, The Breach, and What Else Happened.

== Religion Dispatches ==
In 2018, Religion Dispatches was integrated into Rewire.News as a daily vertical.

Religion Dispatches was founded in 2007 as a daily non-profit online magazine covering religion, politics, and culture. The founders were Gary Laderman, a religion studies scholar from Emory University; Linell Cady, a religion studies scholar from Arizona State University; and Evan Derkacz, a journalist who formerly wrote for AlterNet. Lisa Webster, an editor and religion scholar, joined Evan as co-editor just before the magazine's launch in February 2008.

RD won three Religion Newswriters Association (RNA) awards for Excellence in Religion Commentary and Analysis, a Wilbur Award for outstanding work by secular communicators on religion, and a Science for Religion Writers award from the American Association for the Advancement of Science (AAAS). The website was also recognized as a nominee for the Webby Awards in the Religion & Spirituality category for the 2011, 2012, 2014 and 2015 Webby Awards, and as an official Honoree for Best Editorial Writing in 2016.

In October 2013, Religion Dispatches moved to the University of Southern California's Annenberg School for Communication and Journalism's website. Diane Winston, chairman of Media and Religion at USC, headed the publication.
