= Jordan Lasker =

American internet personality

- Other name: Crémieux Recueil
- Citizenship: American
- Occupations: Internet personality; researcher
- Known for: Writing about race science, psychometrics, GLP-1 receptor agonists
- Website: www.cremieux.xyz/archive

Jordan Lasker (also known on social media as Crémieux Recueil) is an American internet personality and independent researcher. He is also known on X and Substack for compiling charts on what he calls the "Black-White IQ gap", and discussing GLP-1 receptor agonists. He has been associated with natalism.

== Background ==
In 2019, Lasker listed himself at the University of Minnesota-Twin Cities' economics department, an affiliation The Chronicle of Higher Education could not corroborate. As of 2022, Lasker was a PhD student at Texas Tech University.

Lasker uses the pseudonym Crémieux Recueil after the 19th-century French politician Adolphe Crémieux. The Verge noted Crémieux excluded Muslims from French citizenship.

== Career ==
=== Researcher ===
In 2019, Lasker co-authored a paper "Global Ancestry and Cognitive Ability" with Bryan Pesta, John G. R. Fuerst, and Emil Kirkegaard, which cited data from the National Institutes of Health’s (NIH) Database of Genotypes and Phenotypes; it was referred to as "racial hereditarian research" by a 2024 paper. An investigation later found that the 2019 paper's principal investigator Bryan Pesta had violated his data-use agreement by uploading restricted data to an "unapproved online forensic DNA-phenotyping service". The NIH ordered Pesta to destroy any copies of the dataset by June 2021. Pesta was later dismissed from his institution, Cleveland State University. The university also stated that John Fuerst had retained an unauthorized copy of the dataset.

In 2020, Lasker co-authored a meta-analysis which concluded that intelligence heritability estimates do not substantially differ across racial and ethnic groups, "Racial and ethnic group differences in the heritability of intelligence" with John G. R. Fuerst, Emil Kirkegaard, Jan te Nijenhuis and Bryan Pesta.

=== Writer ===
Lasker writes under the account "Crémieux Recueil" on Substack. He has also written for Aporia Magazine under the same nom de plume. Lasker is known for supporting the view that there is a genetic relationship between IQ and race, a position that is rejected by mainstream science.

According to Ali Breland in The Atlantic, Lasker has "suggested that crime is genetic" and has compiled race and intelligence charts, including on the Black-White IQ gap. According to Jason Wilson in The Guardian, Lasker supported the racialist research of Richard Lynn.

Lasker has also written about biohacking and experimental health interventions. Reporting in The New York Times and The Atlantic discussed his 2025 post about low-cost access to GLP-1 receptor agonists through online peptide sources, with The New York Times describing it as a viral do it yourself guide. In 2024, Lasker wrote about Lumina, a probiotic toothpaste containing genetically engineered bacteria; the San Francisco Standard reported that his essay endorsed the product and helped draw attention to it in Bay Area biohacking circles.

=== Internet personality ===
==== Crémieux Receuil ====
Lasker is known as "Crémieux Recueil" on X. In July 2025 he had more than 260,000 followers. Elon Musk and U.S. Vice President JD Vance both follow him.

Lasker has been introduced as "Crémieux Recueil" on podcasts where he was a guest.

==== Other online accounts ====
In 2025, an investigation by the magazine Mother Jones found that between 2014 and 2016 an account on Reddit with the pseudonym Faliceer made posts that endorse "Nazism, eugenics, and racism", and self-identified as a "Jewish White Supremacist Nazi". Mother Jones linked this account to Lasker based on "highly specific biographical details that overlapped with Lasker's offline life", and a statement from Lasker's childhood friend that Lasker had used the "Faliceer" handle when playing video games. Lasker denies that the Faliceer account was operated by him.

=== Speaker ===
Early in 2025, Lasker was a speaker at the Natal Conference. Lasker has posted about falling birthrates, describing it as "the biggest problem of our time", in a post that Elon Musk commented on. According to Frankfurter Allgemeine Zeitung "Lasker defends the theory, supported by Musk, that all countries will eventually collapse because not enough women are having children."

== Views ==
=== Race and intelligence ===
One of Lasker's common focuses is the intersection between race and intelligence. He defends the claim that national IQs vary between country by as much as 40 IQ points, a thesis first proposed by Richard Lynn. These arguments have been discredited and scientific journals have retracted work based on Lynn's data. His writings on this topic have been described as race science, and supporting racial hereditarianism. His work argues that black people are biologically or genetically predisposed to have lower intelligence than white people, while Mother Jones and Current Affairs say his posts imply black people are genetically inferior.

=== Eugenics ===
According to The Guardian, The Atlantic, The Verge, The Week, Wired, and psychologist Evan Giangrande, Lasker is a supporter of eugenics. In a letter to MIT Technology Review, Lasker distanced himself from what he called the popular understanding of eugenics, saying that his views were not about "coercion and cutting people cast as ‘undesirable’ out of the breeding pool" and that what he supports "doesn’t qualify as eugenics by that popular understanding of the term."

=== Fertility ===
Lasker has written that fertility has gone down since the trial of Annie Besant and Charles Bradlaugh in 1877.

== Zohran Mamdani incident ==
In July 2025, Lasker shared details of New York City mayoral candidate Zohran Mamdani's application to Columbia University with The New York Times. In that application, Mamdani, whose father Mahmood Mamdani is an African studies professor, and who is a member of the Indian diaspora born in Uganda, identified himself as both "Asian" and "Black or African American". He did not fill out the section of the form that would have allowed a custom entry and was not an American citizen at the time he filled out his application. The data was derived from a hack, and Lasker shared it with The New York Times as an intermediary. The incident resulted in significant backlash, particularly surrounding the Times' decision to grant Lasker anonymity.

The Verge reported that the hacker, who describes themself as "violently racist" and whose pseudonym is "a racial slur", said the university hacks were intended to test whether universities continued to comply with the Supreme Court's ruling in Students for Fair Admissions v. Harvard. The Verge also reported that Lasker follows the hacker on social media, and the hacker reposted a post from Crémieux calling them "the nicest possible hacker".

== Criticism ==
His views on race and intelligence have been criticized as an example of pseudoscience entering mainstream academia. Psychologist Eric Turkheimer described his publications as "racially motivated and poorly executed work".

His views on race and intelligence have been criticized by academics as an example of pseudoscience entering mainstream academia. Liam Scott of the Columbia Journalism Review described Lasker as a "promoter of white supremacist views".

== Selected publications ==
- Kirkegaard, Emil O. W.; Lasker, Jordan; Kura, Kenya (2019-04-24). "The Intelligence of Biracial Children of U.S. Servicemen in Northeast Asia: Results from Japan". Psych. 1 (1): 132–138.
- Lasker, Jordan; Pesta, Bryan J.; Fuerst, John G. R.; Kirkegaard, Emil O. W. (30 August 2019). "Global Ancestry and Cognitive Ability". Psych. 1 (1): 431–459.
- Kirkegaard, Emil O. W.; Lasker, Jordan (2019-12-23). "Intelligence and Religiosity among Dating Site Users". Psych. 2 (1): 25–33.
- Pesta, Bryan J.; Kirkegaard, Emil O. W.; te Nijenhuis, Jan; Lasker, Jordan; Fuerst, John G. R. (2020-01-01). "Racial and ethnic group differences in the heritability of intelligence: A systematic review and meta-analysis". Intelligence. 78 101408.
- Lasker, Jordan (September 2024). "Measurement Invariance Testing Works". Applied Psychological Measurement. 48 (6): 257–275. doi:10.1177/01466216241261708. ISSN 0146-6216. PMC 11331746. PMID 39166183.
- Svraka, Bernadett; Lasker, Jordan; Ujma, Péter Przemyslaw (November 2024). "Cognitive, affective and sociological predictors of school performance in mathematics". Scientific Reports. 14 (1). Nature Publishing Group: 26480. doi:10.1038/s41598-024-77904-7. hdl:10831/121371. ISSN 2045-2322.
