= Malcolm Donald =

Profile
- Position: Tackle

Personal information
- Born: 1877
- Died: 1949 (aged 71–72)

Career information
- College: Harvard (1897–1899)

Awards and highlights
- First-team All-American (1899); Third-team All-American (1897)

Malcolm Donald (1877–1949) was an American lawyer, eugenicist, white nationalist, and a founder of the Pioneer Fund.

== Life and career ==
He graduated Harvard College (where he played football) and Harvard Law School. He was an editor of Harvard Law Review. He worked at Boston law firms Gaston Snow and Herrick, Smith, & Donald. He served in the War Department during World War I. Following the war, Donald was named Vice President of the Harvard alumni club. He later became a trustee of the Roxbury Latin School.

Historian William H. Tucker has documented Donald's involvement in the Pioneer Fund.

Pioneer Fund principal benefactor Wickliffe Draper chose Donald as treasurer in 1937. Donald was one of Boston's leading attorneys and a long-time trusted friend of the family. The two men had been named as executors of George Draper's will. Donald was trustee of the Draper family fortune, should neither Draper nor his sister outlive their father. Even before the fund's creation, Donald had managed Draper's finances. Donald got a ruling from the federal Treasury Department that the Pioneer Fund was tax-deductible, so Draper's contributions to the fund would be deductible from his own income tax.

Donald did not play a substantive role in the policies or practices of the Pioneer Fund. Donald explained in a letter to Frederick Osborn that Draper was interested not in science but in policy; he wanted "to do something practical," such as "moving the colored race to Liberia" or "strengthening State laws to prevent the unfit from producing children." He was "not ... concerned with research in human genetics since he felt that enough was known on the subject and that the important thing was to have something done." And in personal discussion with Osborn, Draper's list of priorities included not only "colonization of the colored minorities" but also the "reconstruction of American political parties."
