= Religion Dispatches =

American magazine covering religion

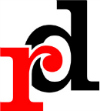
- Executive Editor: Evan Derkacz
- Former editors: Lisa Webster
- Categories: Religion, online magazine
- Frequency: Daily
- Founder: Gary Laderman, Linell Cady, and Evan Derkacz
- First issue: 2007
- Website: https://religiondispatches.org/

Religion Dispatches is a secular daily non-profit online magazine covering religion, politics, and culture. RD covers topics of religious thought, past and present, that underwrite social structures (with a special focus on inequality and injustice).

It was founded in 2007. The founders were Gary Laderman, a religion studies scholar from Emory University; Linell Cady, a religion studies scholar from Arizona State University; and Evan Derkacz, a journalist who formerly wrote for AlterNet. Lisa Webster, an editor and religion scholar, joined Evan as co-editor just before the magazine's launch in February 2008.

RD has won three Religion Newswriters Association (RNA) awards for Excellence in Religion Commentary and Analysis, a Wilbur Award for outstanding work by secular communicators on religion, and a Science for Religion Writers award from the American Association for the Advancement of Science (AAAS). The website was also recognized as an official Nominee for Webby Awards in the Religion & Spirituality category for the 2011, 2012, 2014 and 2015 Webby Awards, and as an official Honoree for Best Editorial Writing in 2016 and 2017.

Religion Dispatches is currently a publication of Political Research Associates. Before that it was located at the University of Southern California's Annenberg School for Communication and Journalism's website from 2013 to 2018 during which time Diane Winston, chairman of Media and Religion at USC, headed the publication.
