= Spent =

Spent may refer to:

- Spent (band), a former indie rock band
- Spent (game), an online game about surviving poverty and homelessness
- Spent, a collection of Peepshow comics by Joe Matt
- Spent: Sex, Evolution, and Consumer Behavior, a 2009 book by Geoffrey Miller
- Spent, a 2025 comic novel by Alison Bechdel

== See also ==
- Spend
- Spent enactment
- Spent nuclear fuel, a fuel no longer useful for sustaining a nuclear reaction
- Spent conviction
