= Audrey M. Shuey =

American psychologist

Audrey Mary Shuey (1900–1977) was an American psychologist and writer. She served as the Chair of the Department of Psychology at Randolph-Macon Women's College.

== Early life ==
Audrey M. Shuey was born in 1900. Shuey took her B.A. at the University of Illinois, her M.A. at Wellesley College, and her Ph.D. at Columbia University where she was a student of Henry Garrett.

== Career ==
Shuey served as the Chair of the Department of Psychology at Randolph-Macon Woman's College.

Shuey published the book The Testing of Negro Intelligence (1958, 2nd ed., 1966) surveying and summarizing the results of 40 years of intelligence tests involving whites and blacks. It argued that race is a biological reality, not a social construct, emphasizing that the 15-point Black-White average IQ difference remained constant from the 1910s to the 1960s, across all regions of the U.S., as well as in Canada and Jamaica. The publication and distribution of her book was funded by Wickliffe Draper and the Pioneer Fund, which is an institution connected to fascists, in a bid to counter the desegregation of the American school system following Brown vs. Board of Education.

== Reception ==
The scholar Graham Richards noted that Shuey's text relied on unpublished material like masters and doctoral theses, many of which originated in the Deep South, that some pre-1940s material that she used contained methodological flaws, and that she overstated the consistency of her sources.

Shuey was also accused of ignoring many other studies which refuted the studies used in her book.

The psychologist Hans Eysenck praised Shuey's work in 1971.

== Death ==
Shuey died in 1977.

== Publications ==
- Shuey, Audrey M. (1966). The Testing of Negro Intelligence (2nd ed.). New York: Social Science Press.
