= Aurelio José Figueredo =

American evolutionary psychologist

- Born: December 27, 1955 (age 70); Victoria de las Tunas, Oriente, Cuba
- Education: University of California, Riverside
- Awards: American Psychological Association George A. Miller Award (2010)
- Scientific career
- Fields: Evolutionary psychology
- Workplaces: University of Arizona
- Thesis: The statistical measurement, developmental mechanisms, and adaptive ecological functions of conditioned host selection in the parasitoid jewel wasp (1987)
- Doctoral advisor: Lewis Petrinovich

Aurelio José Figueredo (born December 27, 1955) is an American evolutionary psychologist. He is a professor of psychology, Family Studies and Human Development at the University of Arizona, where he is also the director of the Ethology and Evolutionary Psychology Laboratory. He is also a member of the interdisciplinary Center for Insect Science at the University of Arizona. His major areas of research interest are the evolutionary psychology and behavioral development of life history strategy, cognition, sex, and violence in human and nonhuman animals, and the quantitative ethology and social development of insects, birds, and primates. He is known for his research on personality, such as a 1997 study in which he and James E. King developed the Chimpanzee Personality Questionnaire to measure the Big Five personality traits in chimpanzees.

In 2017, Figueredo was recognized as a Fellow of the Association for Psychological Science, of which he is a Charter Member, and in 2010 he received the George A. Miller Award for coauthoring the "Outstanding Recent Article on General Psychology" from the American Psychological Association.

Figueredo served for five years as the chair of the board of directors of the Western Comparative Psychological Association in 1992, was a member of the board of directors of the Evaluation Group for Analysis of Data also in 1992, and a member of the scientific advisory committee of the Jane Goodall Institute ChimpanZoo Project in 1994.

Figueredo was Book Review Editor of the journal Evolutionary Behavioral Sciences as of 2017. He has also served as an associate editor for the Journal of Social, Evolutionary, and Cultural Psychology and for Evolutionary Psychology, as well as editor-in-chief of the Human Ethology Bulletin. Figueredo has also reviewed papers for Mankind Quarterly, and has served on the editorial advisory board of the journal as of 2015.

== Controversy ==
The journal Mankind Quarterly has advocated for scientific racism, but Figueredo has disavowed eugenics and racial inferiority.

As of 2018, Figueredo was identified by the Associated Press as the only U.S. scientific researcher receiving funding from the Pioneer Fund, a non-profit institute which promotes scientific racism and eugenics. A Pioneer Fund grant was given to the University of Arizona, and was used by Figueredo to attend the 2016 London Conference on Intelligence, where presentations on eugenics were given. A formal response to the controversy regarding the conference was co-signed by fifteen academic attendees, including Figueredo, and was published in Intelligence in 2018. The response stated that only a small proportion of the talks presented there were on eugenics or race differences. In 2009 Figueredo coauthored a paper for the journal Twin Research and Human Genetics with J. Philippe Rushton, the Pioneer Fund's president at the time, on the heritability of individual differences in life history. The paper was related to Rushton's differential K theory. Describing Figueredo's frequent citation of Rushton's work, Inside Higher Education said that the Rushton's theory "was widely criticized as racist and based on shaky science".
