= The Welfare Trait =

2015 book by Adam Perkins

- First edition (publ. Palgrave Macmillan)
- Author: Adam Perkins
- Publication date: 2015
- ISBN: 9781137555281

The Welfare Trait: How State Benefits Affect Personality is a 2015 book by Adam Perkins, Lecturer in the Neurobiology of Personality at King's College London.

Perkins claims that individuals with aggressive, rule-breaking and anti-social tendencies are over-represented among long-term welfare recipients. He calls this an "employment–resistant personality profile" and finds that it is heritable.

The book was controversial. It initially attracted little attention, with the journal Nature refusing to review it. In 2016, a talk by Perkins was cancelled for fear of disruption. Perkins later wrote "I was no-platformed by student 'radicals' for telling the truth about welfare". That year, Perkins secretly gave a presentation on the book at the London Conference on Intelligence.

The Adam Smith Institute commended the book's "praiseworthy boldness". However the argument was criticised in The Guardian for cherry-picking the data, relying too heavily on mice studies, and resembling eugenics. A professor at University College London reviewed the book negatively, claiming Perkins failed to prove causal links for his assertions, and that "his proposals are more likely to harm, then help, children."

A 2017 review in the British Journal of Psychiatry wrote "it is true that there is good-quality evidence for the transmission of dysfunctional personality traits by epigenetic means across generations".

In 2018, a correction to one of Perkins' papers underlying the book identified seven errors.
