= HPQ =

HPQ may refer to:

- HPQ (record label)
- Harwich International railway station, in England
- History of Philosophy Quarterly
- Hominoid Personality Questionnaire
- HP Inc., an American technology company
- Hewlett-Packard, defunct American technology company and predecessor to HP Inc.
