= Harry F. Weyher Jr. =

American lawyer (1921–2002)

Harry F. Weyher Jr. (August 19, 1921 – March 27, 2002) was an American lawyer.

Born in Wilson, North Carolina, Weyher attended the University of North Carolina. After serving in World War II, he graduated magna cum laude from Harvard Law School in 1949, where he was an editor of the Harvard Law Review. Early in his career, he worked for Cravath, Swaine & Moore and served as special assistant attorney general to the New York State Crime Commission. In 1954, he co-founded the New York City firm Olwine, Connelly, Chase, O'Donnell & Weyher. He became an adjunct associate professor at New York University School of Law and a member of the Society of the Cincinnati. Later in his professional career, he was "of counsel" to the law firm of Hollyer, Brady, Smith, Troxell, Barret, Rockett, Hines, and Mone. He died in La Grange, North Carolina in an area where his family has lived for generations.

== World War II ==
During World War II, Weyher served in the European theater in the U.S. Army, becoming a first sergeant and earning two battle stars. According to Harvard Law School classmate Leon Baker, Weyher "was the first sergeant of a secret 120-member elite intelligence unit, which operated behind enemy lines." In 1945, while Allied forces were attempting to seize the Arnhem bridge, Weyher entered the deserted town of Remagen and discovered a bridge over the Rhine that had not been destroyed by German troops. "Nine weeks after the initial breakthrough at the Remagen bridge, the German army surrendered", wrote Baker.

== Pioneer Fund involvement ==
From 1958 until his death in 2002, Weyher was president of the Pioneer Fund, a nonprofit eugenics foundation. His interest in the Pioneer Fund originated from its opposition to the Supreme Court's decision in Brown v. Board of Education. Weyher was personally recruited by Wickliffe Draper, the founder of the Pioneer Fund. During his time as president of the Pioneer Fund, Weyher directed over $3.5 million to eugenics researchers.
