= 2012 Webby Awards =

US internet awards ceremony

The 16th annual Webby Awards for 2012 were held at the Hammerstein Ballroom in New York City on May 21, 2012, and hosted by comedian Patton Oswalt. Winners were selected from among roughly 10,000 entries and voting by the public for the People's Choice Award was available prior to April 26. The awards ceremony was streamed live in HD on its website.

Newly added to this ceremony were awards for the categories "Mobile Advertising," "Corporate Social Responsibility," and "Best Meme." The "Best Meme" Category represented the first time that there would be no individual credit and no award recipient apart from the meme itself.

== Nominees and winners ==
(from http://www.webbyawards.com/webbys/current.php?season=16)

Category	Webby Award winner	People's Voice winner	Other nominees
Games	androp "Bell" music video game (Archived 18 May 2012 via Wayback); Party Inc. / AID-DCC Inc.	Disney.com/Games (Archived 14 April 2012 via Wayback); Disney Interactive Media Group	FunGoPlay (Archived 10 May 2012 via Wayback); Fungoplay.com
Games	androp "Bell" music video game (Archived 18 May 2012 via Wayback); Party Inc. / AID-DCC Inc.	Disney.com/Games (Archived 14 April 2012 via Wayback); Disney Interactive Media Group	Scratch Pad Fever (Archived 17 May 2012 via Wayback); Modern Climate
Games	androp "Bell" music video game (Archived 18 May 2012 via Wayback); Party Inc. / AID-DCC Inc.	Disney.com/Games (Archived 14 April 2012 via Wayback); Disney Interactive Media Group	The End (http://theend.wedonicethings.com/); Channel 4/ Preloaded
Games-Related	GameTrailers (Archived 25 May 2012 via Wayback); Viacom	Twitch (Archived 20 May 2012 via Wayback); Twitch	EA (Archived 22 May 2012 via Wayback); Odopod / EA
Games-Related	GameTrailers (Archived 25 May 2012 via Wayback); Viacom	Twitch (Archived 20 May 2012 via Wayback); Twitch	G4TV.COM Comic-Con site (Archived 21 May 2012 via Wayback); G4 TV
Games-Related	GameTrailers (Archived 25 May 2012 via Wayback); Viacom	Twitch (Archived 20 May 2012 via Wayback); Twitch	GameSpot (Archived 21 May 2012 via Wayback); CBS Interactive
Mobile & Apps - Games-Handheld Devices	Heineken Star Player (Archived 9 May 2012 via Wayback); AKQA	The Adventures of Timmy: Run Kitty Run (Archived 13 May 2012 via Wayback); Crossborders	LEGO Life of George (http://kukijar.com/lego/); Hello Monday
Mobile & Apps - Games-Handheld Devices	Heineken Star Player (Archived 9 May 2012 via Wayback); AKQA	The Adventures of Timmy: Run Kitty Run (Archived 13 May 2012 via Wayback); Crossborders	ToyToyota "Backseat Driver" (Archived 12 May 2012 via Wayback); Party Inc.
Mobile & Apps - Games-Handheld Devices	Heineken Star Player (Archived 9 May 2012 via Wayback); AKQA	The Adventures of Timmy: Run Kitty Run (Archived 13 May 2012 via Wayback); Crossborders	Ultimate Shuffleboard (Archived 30 May 2012 via Wayback); Peak Systems
Mobile & Apps - Games-Tablet & All Other Devices	MINI Maps (Archived 12 May 2012 via Wayback); DDB Paris		Contre Jour (Archived 3 May 2012 via Wayback); Chillingo
Mobile & Apps - Games-Tablet & All Other Devices	MINI Maps (Archived 12 May 2012 via Wayback); DDB Paris		OLO (Archived 18 May 2012 via Wayback); Sennep
Mobile & Apps - Games-Tablet & All Other Devices	MINI Maps (Archived 12 May 2012 via Wayback); DDB Paris		Real Racing 2 HD (Archived 15 May 2012 via Wayback); Electronic Arts
Mobile & Apps - Games-Tablet & All Other Devices	MINI Maps (Archived 12 May 2012 via Wayback); DDB Paris		Touchgrind BMX (Archived 13 April 2012 via Wayback); Illusion Labs
Interactive Advertising - Game or Application	SPENT (Archived 6 October 2012 via Wayback); McKinney	Domino's Pizza Hero (Archived 27 May 2012 via Wayback); CP+B	MINI Maps (Archived 12 May 2012 via Wayback); DDB Paris
Interactive Advertising - Game or Application	SPENT (Archived 6 October 2012 via Wayback); McKinney	Domino's Pizza Hero (Archived 27 May 2012 via Wayback); CP+B	Nike FightWinter (Archived 9 June 2012 via Wayback); Wieden+Kennedy
Interactive Advertising - Game or Application	SPENT (Archived 6 October 2012 via Wayback); McKinney	Domino's Pizza Hero (Archived 27 May 2012 via Wayback); CP+B	Red Bull Formula Face (Archived 30 May 2012 via Wayback); BUZZIN MONKEY
School / University	Chicago Portfolio School http://www.chicagoportfolio.com	Siegel+Gale A Window on a Creative World the University of the Arts http://www.uarts.edu/	
Online Film & Video: Variety	Lynn Hirschbeg's Screen Tests; TED Talks; Whatks Trending with Shira Lazar; Backstage at the Tonight Show; Between Two Ferns	The Morning After (HDI Films); Is Gray the New Blonde (AARP); You've Got; Unscripted: Muppets (AOL); Cambridge Nights (MIT Media Lab); A Spoonful of Paolo; PBS Arts: Off Book; The Franki Show	

This table is not complete, please help to complete it from material on this page.
