= Cheil Worldwide =

South Korean marketing company

Cheil Worldwide Inc.
- Native name: 제일기획
- Type: Public
- Traded as: KRX: 030000
- Industry: Advertising
- Founded: January 17, 1973; 53 years ago
- Founder: Lee Byung-chul
- Headquarters: Seoul, South Korea
- Area served: Worldwide
- Key people: Kim Jong-hyun (president & CEO)
- Owner: Samsung Electronics (28.43%)
- Parent: Samsung Group
- Subsidiaries: Samsung Sports
- Website: Cheil.com/

- Cheil Worldwide
- Hangul: 제일기획
- Hanja: 第一企劃
- RR: Jeil gihoek
- MR: Cheil kihoek

Cheil Worldwide Inc. (Korean: 제일기획) is a marketing company under the Samsung Group that offers advertising, public relations, shopper marketing, sports marketing, digital marketing, etc. It was established in 1973 with headquarters in Seoul, South Korea.

It is the country's largest and the world's 10th largest advertising agency, by 2022 revenues, and the world's 14th creative agency network. Its major clients include Samsung, Absolut, Adidas, The Coca-Cola Company, GE, General Motors, The Lego Group, Microsoft, Nestle, and Shell. It has 53 offices spread across 5 continents and CIS.

== History ==
In 1973 when the company was established by Lee Byung-chul, the Korean entrepreneur who founded Samsung Group, the official name was Cheil Communications. It began conducting Korea's first nationwide lifestyle surveys in 1977; set up a joint venture with Bozell in 1989; and set up Hakuhodo-Cheil in 1999. The company changed its name to Cheil Worldwide in 2008.

Cheil Worldwide opened its first international branch office in Tokyo in 1988 and established Cheil USA 4 years later. From the late 2000s, it began to acquire stakes in overseas agencies. It acquired a stake in London-based agency Beattie McGuinness Bungay in 2008 and New York-based digital shop, The Barbarian Group in 2009. In order to gain further foothold in the US and China, Cheil bought two more agencies in 2012, McKinney and Bravo Asia, respectively.

Most recently in January 2019, it opened a new office in Buenos Aires, Argentine, increasing the company's global footprint to a total 44 countries. As of May 2019, Cheil has 53 offices and 9 affiliates across 44 countries.

In November 2014, it announced that it had signed a deal to acquire a significant initial investment in the UK-based agency iris worldwide. The deal will potentially rise to 100% of the business over the next five years. In 2016, it acquired Founded, a creative agency with offices in London and San Francisco.

In December 2017, executive vice president Jeongkeun Yoo was appointed to president and CEO after the resignation of Daiki Lim.

In June 2020, Cheil Worldwide has announced the purchase of ColourData, a social media data analytics company based in China. The Agency Network stated that the acquisition helps strengthen its data-driven marketing skills.

== Subsidiaries ==
=== The Barbarian Group ===
Barbarian is an advertising agency specializing in digital and technology, headquartered in New York City, and now owned by Cheil Worldwide. It was founded in 2001 in Boston. Past campaigns include the Subservient Chicken for Burger King, Crystal Pepsi Returns, GE Droneweek, and the Reimagine VR Experience for Etihad. In late 2009, the company sold a majority stake to Cheil Worldwide, a publicly traded South Korean holding company.

In 2010, Barbarian's in-house team built Cinder, an open source coding language for the creative community to program graphics, audio, video, networking, image processing and computational geometry. It was built for their Samsung Centerstage project, which allows consumers to interact with Samsung appliances in an immersive retail experience. Cinder won the inaugural Grand Prix for Innovation Lion at Cannes in 2013.

In 2018 Barbarian reprogrammed an Amazon Alexa Echo Show to act as a receptionist tool, and the developer team then open sourced the code for public use. The reprogrammed Alexa, renamed Barb, is used to help visitors search for, identify and communicate with employees in the office using their internal messaging tool, Slack. Barb was named one of Adweek's Most Important Tech Stories of 2018.

== Awards and recognition ==
Cheil's work for Tesco Homeplus won one Grand-prix and four Golds at the Cannes Lions International Festival of Creativity in 2011 and the Digital Campaign of the Year at the South by Southwest Interactive (SXSWI) in 2012.

A wider range of Cheil's works was recognized in 2012. Award wins include 12 Cannes Lions including 3 Gold and 1 Grand Prix at the Spikes Asia in which Simon Hong, Cheil's Executive Creative Director, presented a seminar session on "Nothing Ever Becomes Real Till It Is Experienced". He discussed the brand experience for consumers, creativity and technology. Earlier in the same year, Cheil partnered with K-Pop group 2NE1 to host a seminar at the Cannes Lions. The session was about how digital technology has driven the "Korean Wave"; how K-pop is taking over the world through digital and social media; and what it means for advertising.

In 2013, The Barbarian Group, the American digital agency acquired by Cheil in 2009, won an Innovation Grand Prix at the Cannes Lions.

The Bridge of Life won a Grand Clio award for Public Relations and two Gold and a Titanium at the Cannes Lions. Other recognition for the group include 2014 One Show - Intellectual Property, for CINDER, 2015 Crain's New York Best Places to Work, 2017 10TH ANNUAL SHORTY AWARDS, Gold Distinction in Branded Series for GE Droneweek 2017, 2018 Digiday Worklife Awards, Most Innovative Culture, 2019 Shorty Awards, Gold Distinction in YouTube Presence for JBL Willdabeast campaign, 2019 Shorty Awards, Silver Distinction in Comedy Video for Solace "What Could Go Wrong" campaign, and 2019 One Show Merit Award, Moving Image Craft, Samsung Fine Art Everyday.

At the Cannes Lions 2013, Cheil UK took one Gold and two Bronze for We are David Bailey campaign; German office's Free the Forced scooped one Gold, one Silver and four Bronze. Later in 2013 at the Eurobest, Simon Hathaway and Daniele Fiandaca from Cheil talked about the emergence of shopper marketing and what the rest of world can learn about the field from South Korea.

Cheil once again spoke at the Cannes Lions seminar in June 2014, with a guest speaker from Samsung Electronics. The seminar addressed how the age of mobile has fundamentally changed the way we live our lives, and how it has changed companies which have to market their products and services to this fast-changing generation of mobile.

In 2015, Cheil won 10 Cannes Lions including one Gold, three Silver and one Bronze for the Look At Me campaign. Look at Me campaign also won 2 Grand Prix at the Spikes Asia. Peter Kim, Cheil's Chief Digital Officer, spoke to the audience at the Cannes Lions seminar, and provided ten insights into things that will change in social media over the next decade.

In 2016, Cheil Worldwide Spain took one Gold and one Bronze for the Blind Cap campaign at Cannes Lions. Also, Cheil and the guest speaker from KT drew attention to the potential impacts of the Internet of Things on marketing - diversification into individualized, independent brand experiences for each consumer.

In 2017, iris Worldwide won one Silver and four Bronze for adidas Glitch campaign at Cannes Lions. Cheil hosted two seminars partnering with CJ E&M. The first session, with South Korea's famous TV producer Yungsuk Nah and actor Seojin Lee, Cheil talked about the 'power of boredom' that's widely taking place beyond TV shows to other different areas including advertising, film and gaming. The second session, with YG Entertainment USA, Cheil shared insights into the rise of KPOP and the KPOP lifestyle.
