= OpenPsych =

Publisher of pseudoscientific open-access academic journals

- Founded: 2014
- Founders: Emil O. W. Kirkegaard, Davide Piffer
- Country of origin: Denmark
- Official website: openpsych.net

OpenPsych is an online collection of three pseudoscientific open access journals covering behavioral genetics, psychology, and quantitative research in sociology. Many articles on OpenPsych promote scientific racism, and the site has been described as a "pseudoscience factory-farm". The journals were started in 2014 by a pair of nonprofessional researchers, Emil Kirkegaard and Davide Piffer, who had difficulty publishing their studies in mainstream peer-reviewed scientific journals. The website describes its contents as open peer reviewed journals, but the qualifications and neutrality of its reviewers and quality of reviews have been disputed.

== Founders ==
OpenPsych was founded by Danish far-right white supremacist Emil Kirkegaard in 2014. Kirkegaard is also the founder of the white nationalist Human Diversity Foundation which publishes Mankind Quarterly, another pseudoscientific journal. The Mankind Quarterly was published by the Ulster Institute for Social Research, which was presided over by Richard Lynn until his death in 2023. Kirkegaard was the registrant of the Mankind Quarterly website between 2017 and February 2023, after which the WHOIS was anonymised. In February 2024, Kirkegaard filed his Mankind Publishing House LLC with the state of Wyoming under the name William Engman (his legal name since 2021).

Co-founder Davide Piffer has written on remote viewing which is widely dismissed by scientists as parapsychology.

== Journal contents and quality ==
OpenPsych consists of three journals—Open Differential Psychology, Open Behavioral Genetics, and Open Quantitative Sociology & Political Science—founded by Emil Kirkegaard and Davide Piffer in 2014. Journal contents are free to access and there is no cost associated with submission. The founders of the website believed that their articles were being regularly rejected by mainstream scientific publishers because of bias against their contentious submissions. Many of the articles are about "race realism", a form of scientific racism, and advance related views which are rejected by mainstream science, such as the idea that there is a genetic basis for group-level differences in measures such as crime and IQ. Unlike typical scientific journals, OpenPsych accepts anonymous manuscripts.

=== Academic reception ===
The quality of peer review at OpenPsych has been disputed. Reviewers do not need advanced academic qualifications, nor need to specialise in what they review. For example, Kirkegaard reviews paper submissions to two of the journals, but has only a BA in linguistics, claiming he is entirely "self-taught". Most of the reviewers are also authors of articles in the same group of journals. Of the thirteen known members of the review board in 2020, two were anonymous and eight seemed to have doctorates. Members of the review teams include Gerhard Meisenberg, Heiner Rindermann, Peter Frost, John Fuerst, Kenya Kura, Bryan J. Pesta, Noah Carl and Meng Hu.

=== Political positions ===
The journals act as a research network for far right, alt-right, and White nationalist causes, following in the footsteps of the Pioneer Fund and Mankind Quarterly; of its top 15 contributors in 2018, 11 had written for Mankind Quarterly in the preceding three years. Several members of its editorial board hold far-right political views and have attended the controversial London Conference on Intelligence. The Southern Poverty Law Center, in an article discussing proponents of scientific racism including Kirkegaard, describes OpenPsych as a "pseudojournal". Kirkegaard is regarded by the Centre for Analysis of the Radical Right to be a "figure on the radical right fringe". Landis MacKellar has described Emil Kirkegaard and John Fuerst as "both outright cranks" noting OpenPsych are "tenderly peer-reviewed online journals specializing in scientifically controversial (bordering on dubious) politically incorrect pieces derived in part from (Roger) Pearsonian hereditarianism."

=== Review process ===
Eric Turkheimer in a coauthored paper in Perspectives on Psychological Science criticises the review process of OpenPsych's journals and describes them as "pseudo-scientific vehicles for scientific racism":

Notably, Fuerst and Dalliard (2014) was published in Open Behavioral Genetics, an online journal created and edited by another author of Pesta et al. (2020; Kirkegaard). Open Behavioral Genetics and related journals in the OpenPsych network (also created and edited by Kirkegaard) have been dismissed by experts in the field as pseudo-scientific vehicles for scientific racism (Panofsky et al., 2020). Per online records of the review process for Fuerst and Dalliard (2014) (OpenPsych, 2014a, 2014b), Kirkegaard was one of the reviewers of Fuerst and Dalliard (2014), and Fuerst himself was one of only a handful of reviewers for the journal at the time. Thus, neither of Fuerst's original analyses has undergone rigorous peer review.

== Controversies ==
=== OkCupid ===
In May 2016, Kirkegaard and Julius Daugbjerg Bjerrekær published a paper in Open Differential Psychology that includes the data of nearly 70,000 OkCupid (a dating website) users, such as their intimate sexual details. The publication was widely criticised at the time and been described as "without a doubt one of the most grossly unprofessional, unethical and reprehensible data releases." Although Kirkegaard claimed the data was public, this was disputed by data ethics scholar Michael Zimmer who pointed out that the data is restricted to logged-in users only:

Moreover, it remains unclear whether the OkCupid profiles scraped by Kirkegaard's team really were publicly accessible. Their paper reveals that initially, they designed a bot to scrape profile data, but that this first method was dropped because it was "a decidedly non-random approach to find users to scrape because it selected users that were suggested to the profile the bot was using." This implies that the researchers created an OkCupid profile from which to access the data and run the scraping bot. Since OkCupid users have the option to restrict the visibility of their profiles to logged-in users only, it is likely the researchers collected—and subsequently released—profiles that were intended to not be publicly viewable. The final methodology used to access the data is not fully explained in the article, and the question of whether the researchers respected the privacy intentions of 70,000 people who used OkCupid remains unanswered.

Kirkegaard uploaded the OkCupid data to the Open Science Framework, but this was later removed after OkCupid filed a Digital Millennium Copyright Act (DMCA) complaint.

=== Noah Carl ===
In April 2019, Noah Carl who reviews submissions for Open Quantitative Sociology & Political Science was dismissed as a research fellow at St Edmund's College, Cambridge University because of his association with OpenPsych, which involved collaborating with a number of individuals who are known to hold racist and far-right political views.
