= Joshua Tybur =

American psychologist

- Born: Joshua M. Tybur
- Education: Arizona State University; University of New Mexico
- Awards: Early Career Award from the Human Behavior and Evolution Society (2018)
- Scientific career
- Fields: Evolutionary psychology
- Institutions: VU Amsterdam
- Thesis: Disgust dissected: An investigation of the validity of the Three Domain Disgust Scale (2009)
- Doctoral advisor: Geoffrey Miller

Joshua M. Tybur is an American psychologist who serves as Professor of Psychology and Infectious Disease in the Department of Experimental and Applied Psychology at VU Amsterdam. Much of his research focuses on the evolutionary psychology of disgust.
