= London Conference on Intelligence =

Research conference at UCL

The London Conference on Intelligence (LCI) is an invitation-only conference for research on human intelligence, including race and intelligence and eugenics. In 2018, Times Higher Education called it "an annual conference on eugenics and intelligence" and several news outlets have described the conference as having ties to white supremacy, neo-Nazism, and scientific racism.

Founded in 2014, it was secretly held in the Pearson Building at University College London (UCL) in London, England, on four occasions. It was hosted by James Thompson, an honorary UCL senior lecturer in psychology. The existence of the conference, as well as the names of some of the attendees, was revealed by the London Student on 10 January 2018. In a statement released in response to news of the conference, UCL said that it had been unaware that the conference had occurred on its campus, and that the speakers there "were not approved or endorsed by UCL". Their statement also said that "We are an institution that is committed to free speech but also to combatting racism and sexism in all forms." UCL also announced that it would investigate whether the organizers breached the university's room booking procedures as well as the circumstances that led to awarding of an honorary senior lectureship to Thompson. Several conference attendees authored a letter defending the conference and disputing that it was mainly about eugenics.

LCI was moved from London to Skanderborg, Denmark, in May 2018. Helmuth Nyborg has said "we don't trust the media" to explain why conference organizers avoid public attention.

== UCL investigation ==
The LCI was investigated in January 2018 following the 2017 attendance of Toby Young (who was then involved in controversy over his past tweets and tenure on the board of the government-funded Office for Students) at these conferences, as well as their alleged eugenicist content, neo-Nazi links and clandestine nature. The Guardian reported that "Speakers included white supremacists and a researcher who has previously advocated child rape."

Thompson hosted the event without informing senior university officials. In response to an investigation by London Student revealing that the conference had taken place on UCL's campus, UCL announced it would be investigating how a conference on eugenics was able to occur on their campus without the university's knowledge. A UCL spokesperson told The Guardian that "UCL is investigating a potential breach of its room bookings process for events"; UCL also revoked Thompson's approval to organize future conferences. The UCL issued a press release saying that it would investigate the circumstances that led to awarding of an honorary senior lectureship to Thompson, and reaffirmed that it is committed to combating racism. UCL has now cut all ties with Thompson and taken steps to avoid the possibility of such events taking place without the university's knowledge.

In response to the controversy, the journal Intelligence published a correspondence defending the conference authored by 15 of its attendees. The correspondence disputed that the LCI was a eugenics conference, saying that, among the 75 presentations given there over four years, only two had been on the topic of eugenics. One of the authors of the correspondence, psychologist Aurelio José Figueredo, was subsequently reported to be the only academic receiving funding from the Pioneer Fund, which is associated with scientific racism and eugenics. Figueredo told the Associated Press that the conference was not about eugenics, and that its overall theme could not be represented "by a few presentations".

This led to the university setting up an inquiry looking into its historical links with eugenics. Its report was published in February 2020, but nine of the 16 members of the team refused to sign it because it did not look into the conference meetings. Three of its buildings, the Galton Lecture Theatre, Pearson Lecture Theatre and the Pearson Building were renamed.

== Attendees ==
Notable attendees of at least one of the conferences include:

- Noah Carl, then an academic at the University of Oxford.
- Aurelio José Figueredo
- Paul Irwing
- Emil Kirkegaard, founder of the website OpenPsych, attended and spoke at the 2017 conference.
- Richard Lynn, a British psychologist, who attended the 2017 conference.
- Gerhard Meisenberg, Director of the Pioneer Fund
- Edward M. Miller
- Jan te Nijenhuis
- Helmuth Nyborg, a Danish psychologist, who attended in 2015 and 2016.
- Heiner Rindermann
- Andrew Sabisky, subsequently advisor at No.10.
- Toby Young, a British journalist, who also attended the 2017 conference.
