= Lewis Petrinovich =

American evolutionary psychologist (1930–2021)

- Born: June 12, 1930
- Died: July 28, 2021 (aged 91)
- Education: University of Idaho, University of California, Berkeley
- Awards: Member of the California Academy of Sciences since 1982
- Scientific career
- Fields: Evolutionary psychology
- Workplaces: University of California, Riverside
- Thesis: The Effect of Strychnine Sulphate on Discrimination Learning in Rats (1962)
- Doctoral students: Aurelio Jose Figueredo

Lewis Franklin Petrinovich (June 12, 1930 - July 28, 2021) was an American evolutionary psychologist and professor emeritus of psychology at the University of California, Riverside. His work has included research on lefthandedness, the potential evolutionary origins of cannibalism, and evolutionary ornithology.

== Education ==
Petrinovich received his bachelor's degree from the University of Idaho in 1952 and his Ph.D. from the University of California, Berkeley in 1962.
