= Diana Fleischman =

American evolutionary psychologist (born 1981)

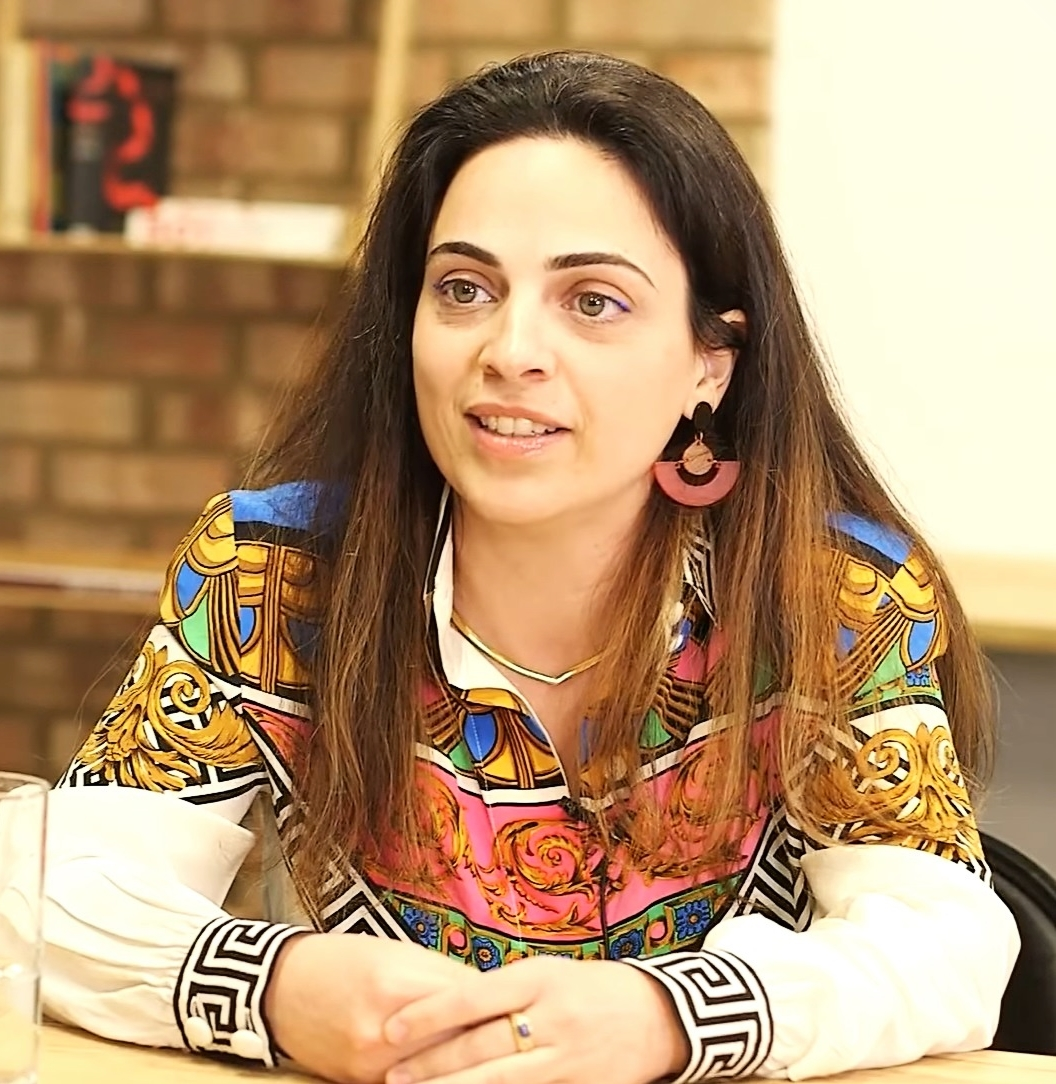
- Fleischman in 2019
- Born: April 22, 1981 (age 45); São Paulo, Brazil
- Occupations: Psychologist; lecturer
- Spouse: Geoffrey Miller (2019–present)
- Children: 2

Academic background
- Education: Oglethorpe University
- Alma mater: University of Texas at Austin
- Academic advisor: David Buss

Academic work
- Discipline: Evolutionary biology; Evolutionary psychology
- Website: dianafleischman.com

Diana Santos Fleischman (born April 22, 1981) is an evolutionary psychologist and podcaster. Her field of research includes the study of disgust, human sexuality, eugenics, and hormones and behaviour. She also has interests in natalism, effective altruism, animal welfare, and feminism. She is one of the hosts of the Aporia podcast.

== Early life and education ==
Fleischman was born in São Paulo, Brazil. Her father's family is of German-Jewish descent, and she attended both Catholic church and synagogue. Fleischman grew up in Georgia and was not taught about evolution in the public school system there. She was passionate about evolution from an early age, earning the nickname "monkey girl" from classmates at age 12.

Her undergraduate degree is from Oglethorpe University, and she also spent a year at the London School of Economics as an undergraduate. She was awarded her PhD in 2009 from the University of Texas at Austin, where her advisor was David Buss, and went on to do a postdoc at UNC Chapel Hill.

== Career ==
Fleischman was a postdoctoral research associate at the Centre for Women's Mood Disorders at the University of North Carolina. She collaborated with the centre's director, David Rubinow, and Susan Girdler, on a project that documented changes in women's behaviors and moods during different stages of their menstrual cycle. She was a lecturer in the department of psychology at the University of Portsmouth from 2011 to 2020. She is a research assistant professor in the department of psychology at the University of New Mexico.

One of her findings covered in the press is that disgust inhibits sexual arousal in women more than fear. In addition to academic publications and lectures, she also gives public lectures and writes articles for laypeople. In 2018, she was a speaker at Humanists UK's annual celebration of Darwin Day. In August 2020, she started a blog at Psychology Today, called How to Train Your Boyfriend, the same title as a book she is writing.

Fleischman is one of the hosts of the Aporia podcast, which is owned by the Human Diversity Foundation. She is also a contributor to the Aporia magazine, which describes itself as refusing to "cower beneath the god of political correctness".

== Views ==
=== Effective altruism ===
Fleischman is heavily involved in the effective altruism movement and previously served on the board of the Sentience Institute.

=== Meat consumption ===
Fleischman has described herself as an "ex-vegan" and a conscious eater. Between 2013 and 2018, she controversially promoted "bivalveganism" (Note: Michael Huemer has used the term ostroveganism.), as she advocated for the consumption of mussels and oysters within a vegan diet, claiming they are unlikely to suffer as "bivalves have a very simple nervous system which is not aggregated in anything like a brain". She has argued that oysters contain nutrients such as Vitamin B_{12} and zinc, which can be difficult to obtain from a vegan diet. Fleischman also consumed eggs but donated to a vegetarian charity to "offset" this.

In 2021, Fleischman commented that she had become "pretty disillusioned with the attitudes and approach of the vegan community". She has criticized vegans for believing that all animals matter equally morally. In opposition to veganism, she advocates for sentientism as a utilitarian moral perspective. Under this view, different animal species are ranked based on the degree of suffering they experience. She has suggested that "animals don't care whether we label ourselves vegetarian. I can help reduce suffering much more by convincing five people to give up chicken and fish than I can by convincing one person to become vegetarian". She has also stated that eating beef likely involves less animal suffering than eating chicken, as about 200 chickens need to be killed to produce the same amount of meat as a cow. She has additionally called cultured meat "our best hope of preventing animal suffering in the future".

=== Eugenics ===
In 2021, Fleischman co-authored the paper "Can 'eugenics' be defended?", which argued that the scientific debate around genetic enhancement was polarized and concluded that "just as enhancement isn't a unified category that we can simply judge as morally good or bad, so too with genetic enhancement or eugenics". Fleischman wrote an essay in 2023, titled "You're Probably a Eugenicist", arguing that Dor Yeshorim's goal of reducing the rate of Tay–Sachs disease and cystic fibrosis in Jewish families could be described as eugenicist and that "gay men and lesbian women in the US often use gamete donors from egg and sperm banks to have kids in a process that is transparently eugenic ... Organisations that recruit egg and sperm donors don't just recruit for fertility, they also screen for mental and physical health, height, education and criminal history – because that's what their clients want and expect".

Fleischman is a staunch advocate of polygenic embryo screening. According to historian of science Emily Klancher Merchant, Fleischman has claimed that "selecting an embryo according to its predicted educational attainment is no different from selecting one according to its number of chromosomes". Fleischman is quoted as saying "we are all eugenicists".

=== Natalism ===
Fleischman has been described as pronatalist, notably saying, "I encourage people who are responsible and smart and conscientious to have children, because they're going to make the future better." She attended the 2023 Natal Conference held in Austin, Texas, where she argued that people with mental illness are statistically likely to marry other mentally ill people and pass those genes along to their children.

== Personal life ==
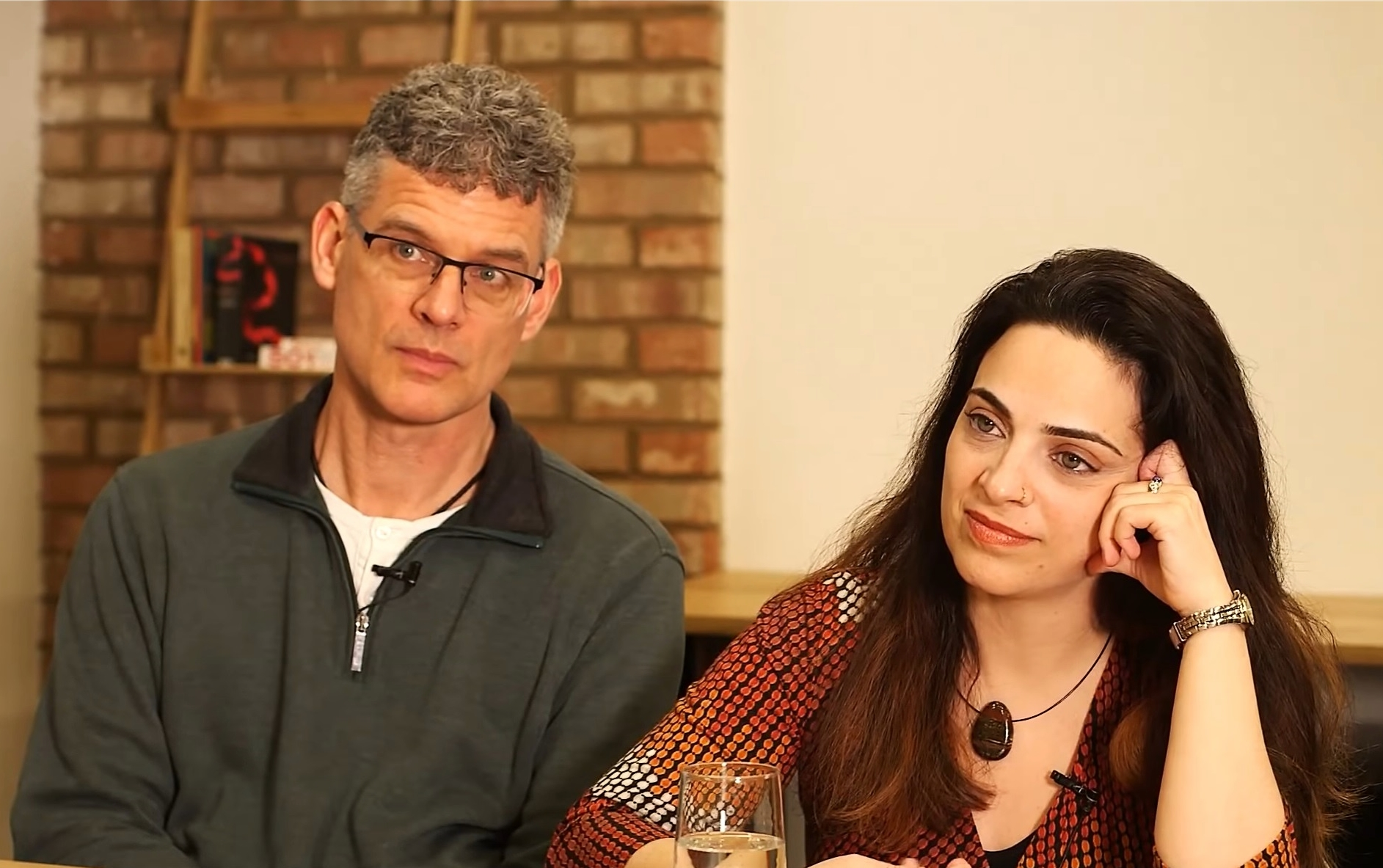
Fleischman with husband Geoffrey Miller in 2019

Fleischman is a member of Giving What We Can, a community of people who have pledged to donate 10% of their income to the world's most effective charitable organisations. She is a utilitarian.

On November 29, 2019, she married fellow American evolutionary psychologist Geoffrey Miller. The couple had earlier appeared together in an interview advocating for polyamory. They have two children, one born in 2022 and the other in 2023.

== Selected publications ==
- Confer, Jaime C.; Easton, Judith A.; Fleischman, Diana S.; Goetz, Cari D.; Lewis, David M. G.; Perilloux, Carin; Buss, David M. (2010). "Evolutionary psychology: Controversies, questions, prospects, and limitations". American Psychologist. 65 (2): 110–126. doi:10.1037/a0018413. ISSN 1935-990X. PMID 20141266.
- Fleischman, Diana S. & Fessler, D. M (January 2011). "Progesterone's effects on the psychology of disease avoidance: Support for the compensatory behavioral prophylaxis hypothesis". Hormones and Behavior. 59 (2): 271–275. doi:10.1016/j.yhbeh.2010.11.014. ISSN 0018-506X. PMID 21134378. S2CID 27607102.
- Fleischman, Diana S.; Navarrete, C. David; Fessler, Daniel M.T. (April 22, 2010). "Oral Contraceptives Suppress Ovarian Hormone Production". Psychological Science. 21 (5): 750–752. doi:10.1177/0956797610368062. ISSN 0956-7976. PMID 20483856. S2CID 9523224.
- Fleischman, Diana S. (2014), Women's Disgust Adaptations, Evolutionary Psychology, Springer New York, pp. 277–296, doi:10.1007/978-1-4939-0314-6_15, ISBN 978-1-4939-0313-9
- Fleischman, Diana S.; Veit, Walter; Anomaly, Jonathan; Agar, Nicholas; Peter, Singer; Minerva, Francesca (2021). "Can 'eugenics' be defended?". Monash Bioethics Review. 39 (1): 60–67. doi:10.1007/s40592-021-00129-1. PMC 8321981. PMID 34033008.
