= Noah Carl =

British sociologist

Noah Carl is a British researcher who co-owns the Daily Sceptic blog. He was investigated and subsequently dismissed from his position as a Toby Jackman Newton Trust Research Fellow at St Edmund's College, Cambridge after over 500 academics signed a letter repudiating his research and public stance on race and intelligence, calling it "ethically suspect and methodologically flawed", and stating their concern that "racist pseudoscience is being legitimised through association with the University of Cambridge." An investigation by the college concluded that Carl's work was "poor scholarship" which violated standards of academic integrity, and that Carl had collaborated with right-wing extremists.

== Career ==
Carl received a BA in Human Sciences, an MSc in Sociology and a DPhil in Sociology from the University of Oxford. His DPhil thesis was titled Cognitive ability and socio-political beliefs and attitudes. Prior to his appointment to the St Edmund's College, Cambridge fellowship, Carl received media attention for papers on the link between artistic tastes and views on Brexit, the reasons why London pubs are disappearing, and a study for Adam Smith Institute which found that conservatives were heavily underrepresented among academics at British universities. Additionally, he was in the news for a study on the relationship between intelligence and trust in other members of society.

His work has been published in academic journals such as Intelligence, the Journal of Biosocial Science, the British Journal of Sociology, as well as Mankind Quarterly, which is commonly described as a white supremacist journal. As of 2018, he was the second most prolific contributor to OpenPsych, an online publisher that has been described in the New Statesman as a "pseudo-science factory-farm". According to an article in the New Statesman from February 2018, Carl had also published two papers on whether larger Muslim populations make terrorism more likely and one suggesting that British stereotypes about immigrants are "largely accurate". In relation to the latter article, the New Statesman quoted Dr. Niko Yiannakoulias of McMaster University as commenting: "It is never OK to publish research this bad, even in an inconsequential online journal."

Carl has spoken twice at the London Conference on Intelligence, a "conference on race, intelligence and eugenics which in the past has been covertly held at University College London." He was one of 15 attendees to collaborate on a letter defending the conference following media coverage. The letter was published in the journal Intelligence in September 2018.

== Appointment controversy and firing ==
In December 2018, Carl was awarded the Toby Jackman Newton Trust Research Fellowship, a three year fellowship at St Edmund's College. More than 500 academics signed a letter opposing Carl's appointment to the fellowship, stating their "deep concern" that "ethically suspect and methodologically flawed ...racist pseudoscience is being legitimised through association with the University of Cambridge." Clément Mouhot, one of the letter's organizers, was quoted in The Guardian as saying that Carl's work relied on "selective use of data and unsound statistical methods which have been used to legitimise racist stereotypes about groups".

An internal investigation at St Edmund's concluded that Carl's work demonstrated "poor scholarship" and "did not comply with established criteria for research ethics and integrity", and that it fell outside the normal protections for academic free speech as a result. The investigation also found that Carl had "collaborated with a number of individuals who were known to hold extremist views", and that continuing his affiliation would risk allowing the college to be used to "promote views that could incite racial or religious hatred" and "bring the College into disrepute". Carl was subsequently dismissed from his fellowship.

In the period leading up to Carl's firing and afterward, some students questioned whether St Edmund's had failed to properly vet him before he was hired in the first place. A separate investigation into the appointment process itself found no irregularities in the process of recruiting Carl, but did recommend changes to future hiring procedures.

In June 2019, Noah Carl began crowdfunding a legal challenge to his dismissal. In September 2019 his $100,000 fundraising goal was reached. Varsity reported that this campaign was coordinated by a company created by a developer named Conner Douglass who had provided similar services to white nationalist Richard Spencer and other neo-Nazis involved in the 2017 "Unite the Right" rally in Charlottesville, Virginia. In March 2021, Carl withdrew his claim; the case was settled by a confidential agreement between both parties.

== The Daily Sceptic ==
Since October 2021, Carl has been a director of the company Skeptics Ltd., publisher of The Daily Sceptic, which promotes misinformation about COVID-19 vaccines and climate change denial.

Carl is a frequent writer for The Daily Sceptic and has published articles critical of the COVID-19 lockdown in the United Kingdom as well as support for the Great Barrington Declaration.

== Aporia Magazine ==
As of 2024, Carl is an editor for Aporia Magazine, owned by the far-right Human Diversity Foundation, which has published interviews with eugenicists and advocates of scientific racism.
