= George A. Draper =

- Born: November 4, 1855; Hopedale, Massachusetts
- Died: February 7, 1923 (aged 67)
- Education: Massachusetts Institute of Technology
- Occupation: Businessman
- Children: Wickliffe Draper
- Relatives: Eben Sumner Draper (brother)

George A. Draper (November 4, 1855 – February 7, 1923) was an American textile industrialist.

== Biography ==
=== Early life ===
George Albert Draper was born on November 4, 1855, in Hopedale, Massachusetts. He was a descendant of early Massachusetts settler James Draper. He had a brother, Eben Sumner Draper, who went on to serve as the 44th Governor of Massachusetts from 1909 to 1911.

At the age of seventeen, Draper entered the Massachusetts Institute of Technology, where he studied for two years.

=== Career ===
He joined his father's businesses as treasurer at Hopedale Machine Company and later at the Draper Company.

He was President of the Grafton and Upton Railroad, and of the Harmony Mills; director in the Milford National Bank, First National Bank of Boston, Brogon Cotton Mills Company, of Anderson, North Carolina, and of the Calhoun Cotton Mills of Calhoun, North Carolina.

=== Death ===
He died on February 7, 1923.

=== Bibliography ===
Some Views on the Tariff Question by an Old Business Man. The American Market for the American People, New York 1886.

== Legacy ==
His son Wickliffe Draper inherited his fortune and used it to begin the Pioneer Fund.
