= Gerhard Meisenberg =

German biochemist (born 1953)

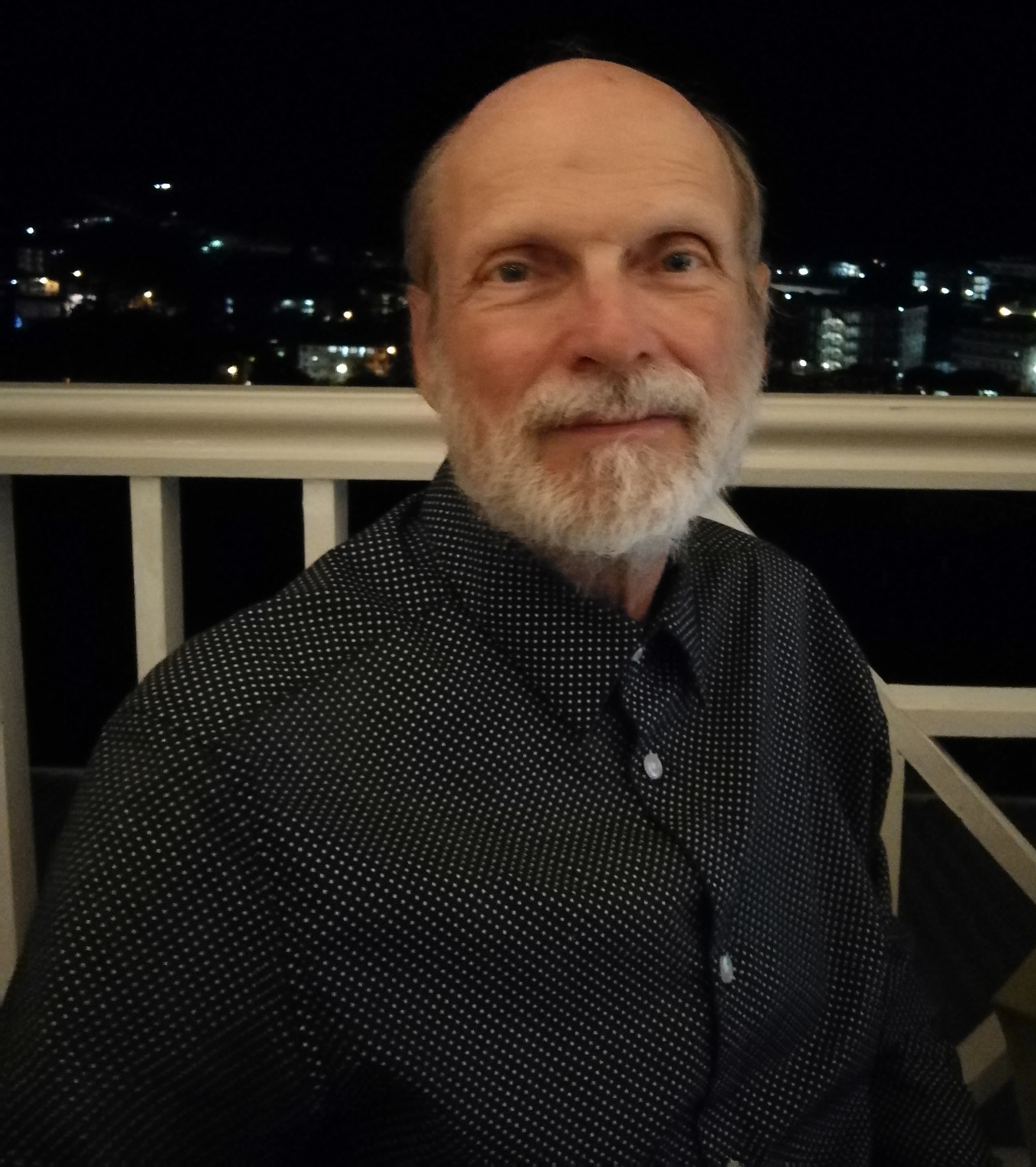
- Meisenberg in 2018
- Born: 22 January 1953 (age 73); Dortmund, Germany
- Education: University of Bochum (M.Sc.), LMU Munich (Ph.D.)
- Scientific career
- Fields: Biochemistry
- Workplaces: Ross University School of Medicine (c. 1984 – c. 2018)
- Thesis: (1981)

Gerhard Meisenberg (born 22 January 1953) is a German biochemist. As of 2018, he was a professor of physiology and biochemistry at Ross University School of Medicine in Dominica. He is a director of the Pioneer Fund, which has been described as a hate group by the Southern Poverty Law Center. He was, until 2018 or 2019, the editor-in-chief of Mankind Quarterly, which is commonly described as a white supremacist journal and purveyor of scientific racism.

Meisenberg was on the editorial board for the journal Intelligence until late 2018. Geneticist Daniel MacArthur, writing for Wired, described a letter Meisenberg sent to Nature as advocating for the future use of selective breeding or genetic engineering if group genetic differences in intelligence are found. Meisenberg attended and helped organize the London Conference on Intelligence, and was one of 15 attendees to collaborate on a letter defending the conference following media reports of its ties to white supremacy, neo-Nazism, and racist pseudoscience.

== Research ==
Meisenberg has proposed a model of economic development in nations that attempts to predict future development based on historical trends in intelligence, education and economic growth.

Science journalist Angela Saini, in an opinion for The Guardian, has said that Meisenberg's views on race and intelligence are "unsupported by evidence" and "generally receive little to no attention from within the everyday scientific community".

Meisenberg wrote and self-published the 2007 book In God's Image: The Natural History of Intelligence and Ethics, claiming that genotype determines both physiology and behavior. Evolutionary biologist and historian R. Paul Thompson, for The Quarterly Review of Biology, described the book as well written, but based on unsupported generalizations, saying "the overall program of the book [is] too extreme, too ideologically driven, and too biologically and anthropologically unsophisticated." Anthropologist Jonathan M. Marks, for the International Journal of Primatology, criticized both the underlying premise of the work, and Meisenberg's "uncritical and cavalier approach" to the topic. Marks compared the book with those by J. Philippe Rushton and Immanuel Velikovsky.

== Books ==
- Meisenberg, Gerhard; Simmons, William H. (2016). Principles of Medical Biochemistry (4 ed.). Elsevier. ISBN 9780323296168.
- Meisenberg, Gerhard (2007). In God's Image: The Natural History of Intelligence and Ethics. Sussex: Book Guild Publishing. ISBN 9781846240553.
