= The Daily Sceptic =

British blog

- Home page in January 2023
- Available in: English
- Founder: Toby Young
- Website: dailysceptic.org

The Daily Sceptic is a blog created by British commentator Toby Young. It has published misinformation about COVID-19 vaccines and engaged in climate change denial.

== History ==
Young founded The Daily Sceptic as a successor to his previous blog Lockdown Sceptics, which was set up in April 2020. He serves as the website's editor-in-chief.

The blog is published by the company Skeptics Ltd; sociologist Noah Carl, businessman Luke Johnson and Toby Young are its directors.

In April 2024, naturalist Chris Packham referred to the blog as the "Daily Septic" in an appearance on BBC One and said it was "basically put together by a bunch of professionals with close affiliations to the fossil fuel industry." Young called Packham's claim "both false and defamatory".

== Content ==
=== COVID-19 vaccine misinformation ===
In October 2021, The Daily Sceptic published an article suggesting that Office for National Statistics (ONS) data showing an increase in the number of teenage deaths between June and September 2021 was connected to the rollout of COVID-19 vaccines in the United Kingdom. The ONS confirmed that the figures were accurate, but added that there was no evidence to link the increase in deaths to the COVID-19 vaccines.

In November 2021, The Daily Sceptic used data published in a UK Health Security Agency (UKHSA) report to claim that 71% of adults hospitalised with COVID-19 were vaccinated. The disinformation analysis organisation Logically noted that the complete UKHSA report cautioned against using the raw data to estimate vaccine effectiveness due to it not taking inherent biases such as "differences in risk, behaviour and testing" into account.

In September 2022, The Daily Sceptic reported on a declaration by a group of scientists and doctors claiming that the COVID-19 vaccines were causing an "international medical crisis". The fact-checking website Health Feedback noted that The Daily Sceptic did not acknowledge that the claims made in the declaration had previously been fact-checked and found to be inaccurate, unsupported or misleading.

Also in September 2022, PayPal shut down the accounts of Young, the Free Speech Union and The Daily Sceptic. The accounts were closed because of breaches of PayPal's acceptable use policy, thought to be because of misinformation about COVID-19 vaccines. The accounts were restored later that month after extensive criticism of PayPal's actions by MPs.

In December 2022, The Daily Sceptic claimed that a study published in the Clinical Research in Cardiology journal showed that people who had "died suddenly" were probably killed by the COVID-19 vaccines. The article was widely shared on social media, because of the phrase "died suddenly" being associated with an anti-vaccine film of the same name. Experts consulted by Health Feedback found that the claim was not supported by the study's actual findings.

=== Climate change denial ===
In August 2022, a Daily Sceptic article claimed that the World Climate Declaration had "dealt a savage blow" to the idea that man-made greenhouse gas emissions are responsible for climate change, and argued that global warming may instead be a natural event. Climate Feedback and Euronews noted that most of the document's signatories were not climate scientists and included personalities with ties to fossil fuel interests, and that experts in the field of climatology had concluded that human greenhouse gas emissions are predominantly responsible for climate change. A March 2023 report by the Institute for Strategic Dialogue found that The Daily Sceptic article was the fourth most-shared URL from among 32 climate-denying websites on Twitter between 1 January 2022 and 1 March 2023.

In October 2022, a Daily Sceptic article said that studies in Greenland showed that climate change is caused by natural factors rather than carbon emissions. The scientists behind these studies told Agence France-Presse that The Daily Sceptic had misrepresented their findings, and that the impact of fossil fuels on global warming was well-documented.

A January 2023 Daily Sceptic article cited a sentence from the abstract of a 2020 study published in Nature that noted a lack of rising temperatures in Antarctica despite rising levels of carbon dioxide, claiming it proved that human-driven climate change is an "unproven hypothesis". The paper's co-author, Hansi Singh of the University of Victoria in Canada, told PolitiFact that the abstract had been taken out of context. She noted that the point of the paper was to show that Antarctica experienced significantly less warming than the global average between 1950 and 2014. The article was shared by American political commentator Dinesh D'Souza in April.

A May 2023 Daily Sceptic article claimed that underwater volcanoes could cause global warming which is otherwise attributed to human activities, and that climate models do not take volcanic activity into consideration. Marit-Solveig Seidenkrantz, a professor of geology and climate change at Aarhus University in Denmark, called The Daily Sceptic's article an example of "alternative facts". She explained that climate models do account for volcanic activity, and that the amount of carbon dioxide produced by human activity is 60 times higher than the amount produced by volcanoes.
