= The Mating Mind =

2000 book by Geoffrey Miller

- Author: Geoffrey Miller
- Language: English
- Genre: Nonfiction
- Publisher: Doubleday
- Publication date: 2000

The Mating Mind: How Sexual Choice Shaped the Evolution of Human Nature is a 2000 book by the American evolutionary psychologist Geoffrey Miller, in which he argues that the vast majority of human characteristics are fitness indicators or the result of mate choice, including artistic or moral excellence.
