= Clément Mouhot =

French mathematician and academic (born 1978)

Clément Mouhot (French: [muo]; born 19 August 1978) is a French mathematician and academic. He is Professor of Mathematical Sciences at the University of Cambridge. His research is primarily in partial differential equations and mathematical physics (statistical mechanics, Boltzmann equation, Vlasov equation).

== Biography ==
Mouhot obtained his PhD in 2004 under the supervision of Cédric Villani at the École normale supérieure de Lyon.

Since 2011, he is Associate editor of Acta Applicandae Mathematicae and of the Journal of Statistical Physics. Since 2012, he is Co-Editor-in-chief of the ESAIM Proceedings. Since 2014 he is Associate editor of Communications in Mathematical Physics.

His work "On Landau damping" with Villani (published in 2011) was quoted in the Fields Medal laudation of Villani in 2010. In 2013, his work "Kac's program in kinetic theory" with Mischler was the subject of a Séminaire Bourbaki. Mouhot was an invited speaker at International Congress of Mathematicians in Rio de Janeiro in 2018, and at the conference Dynamics, Equations and Applications in Kraków in 2019.

In 2014 he was awarded the Whitehead Prize. and the "Grand Prix Madame Victor Noury" of the French "Académie des sciences". He has won the 2015/2016 Adams Prize writing on the subject Applied Analysis.

In 2018, Mouhot helped organise a letter protesting Noah Carl's appointment to a fellowship at St Edmund's College, with Mouhot and other signatories describing Carl's work on genetics and race as pseudoscience.
