= Geoffrey Miller (psychologist) =

American evolutionary psychologist (born 1965)

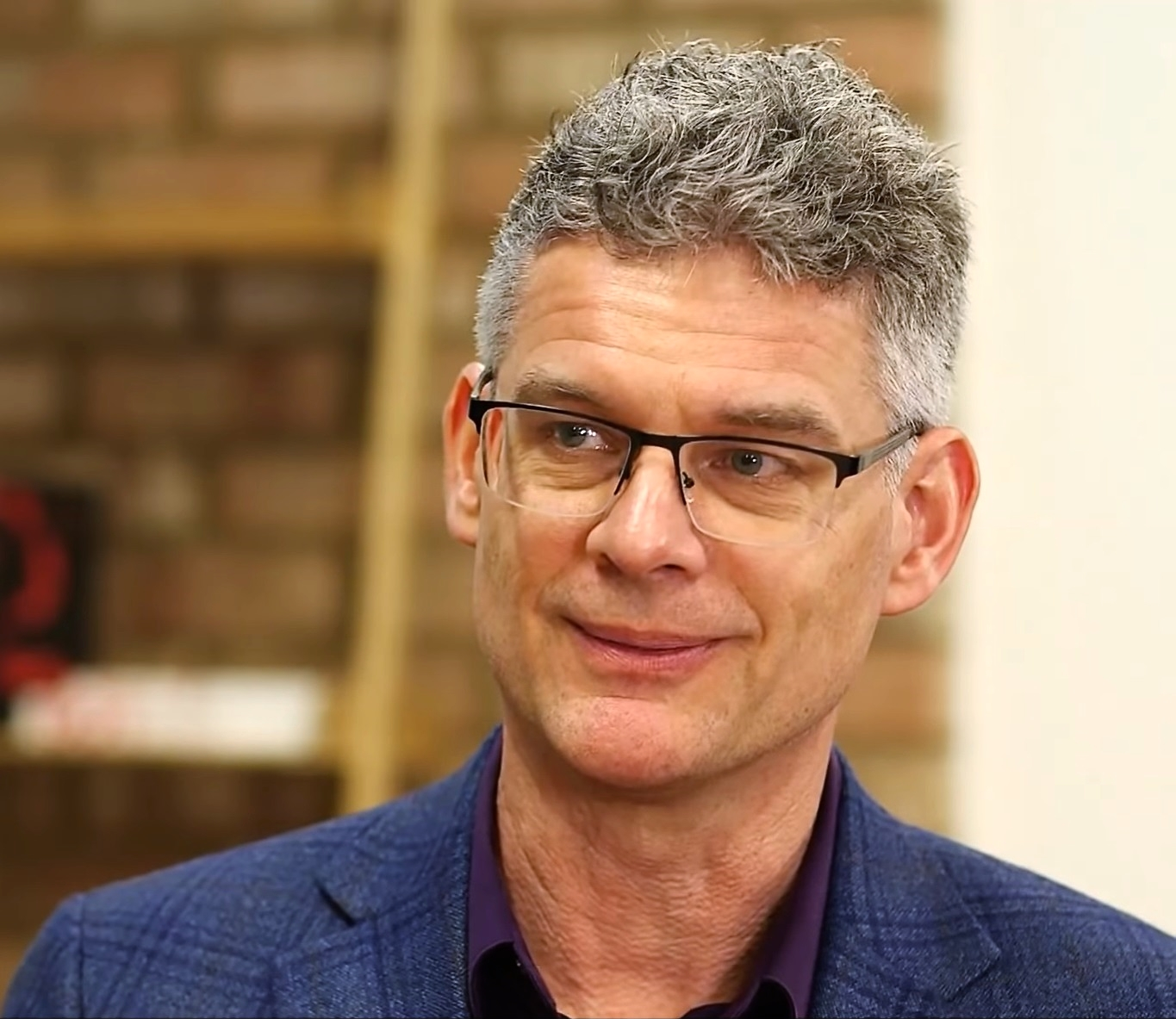
- Miller in 2019
- Born: 1965 (age 60–61); Cincinnati, Ohio, U.S.
- Education: Columbia University (BA); Stanford University (PhD)
- Known for: Sexual selection in humans
- Spouse: Diana Fleischman (m. 2019)
- Children: 2
- Scientific career
- Fields: Evolutionary psychology
- Workplaces: University of New Mexico
- Thesis: Evolution of the Human Brain through Runaway Sexual Selection
- Doctoral advisor: Roger Shepard
- Doctoral students: Joshua Tybur
- Website: primalpoly.com

Geoffrey Franklin Miller (born 1965) is an American evolutionary psychologist, author, and associate professor of psychology at the University of New Mexico. He is known for his research on sexual selection in human evolution.

== Education, career, and personal life ==
Born in Cincinnati, Ohio, Miller graduated from Columbia University in 1987, where he earned a BA in biology and psychology. He received his PhD in cognitive psychology from Stanford University in 1993, with Roger N. Shepard as principal adviser.

Miller has held positions as a postdoctoral researcher in the evolutionary and adaptive systems group in the School of Cognitive and Computing Sciences at the University of Sussex (1992–94); lecturer in the department of psychology at the University of Nottingham (1995); research scientist at the Center for Adaptive Behavior and Cognition at the Max Planck Institute for Psychological Research, Munich, Germany (1995–96); and senior research fellow at the Centre for Economic Learning and Social Evolution, University College London (1996–2000). He has worked at the University of New Mexico since 2001, where he is associate professor. In 2009, he was visiting scientist at the Genetic Epidemiology Group, Queensland Institute of Medical Research, Australia.

In 2015, in collaboration with writer Tucker Max, Miller launched The Mating Grounds, a podcast and blog offering advice about men's sexual strategies.

Miller has an adult daughter and also helped raise two teenage stepchildren from a previous relationship.

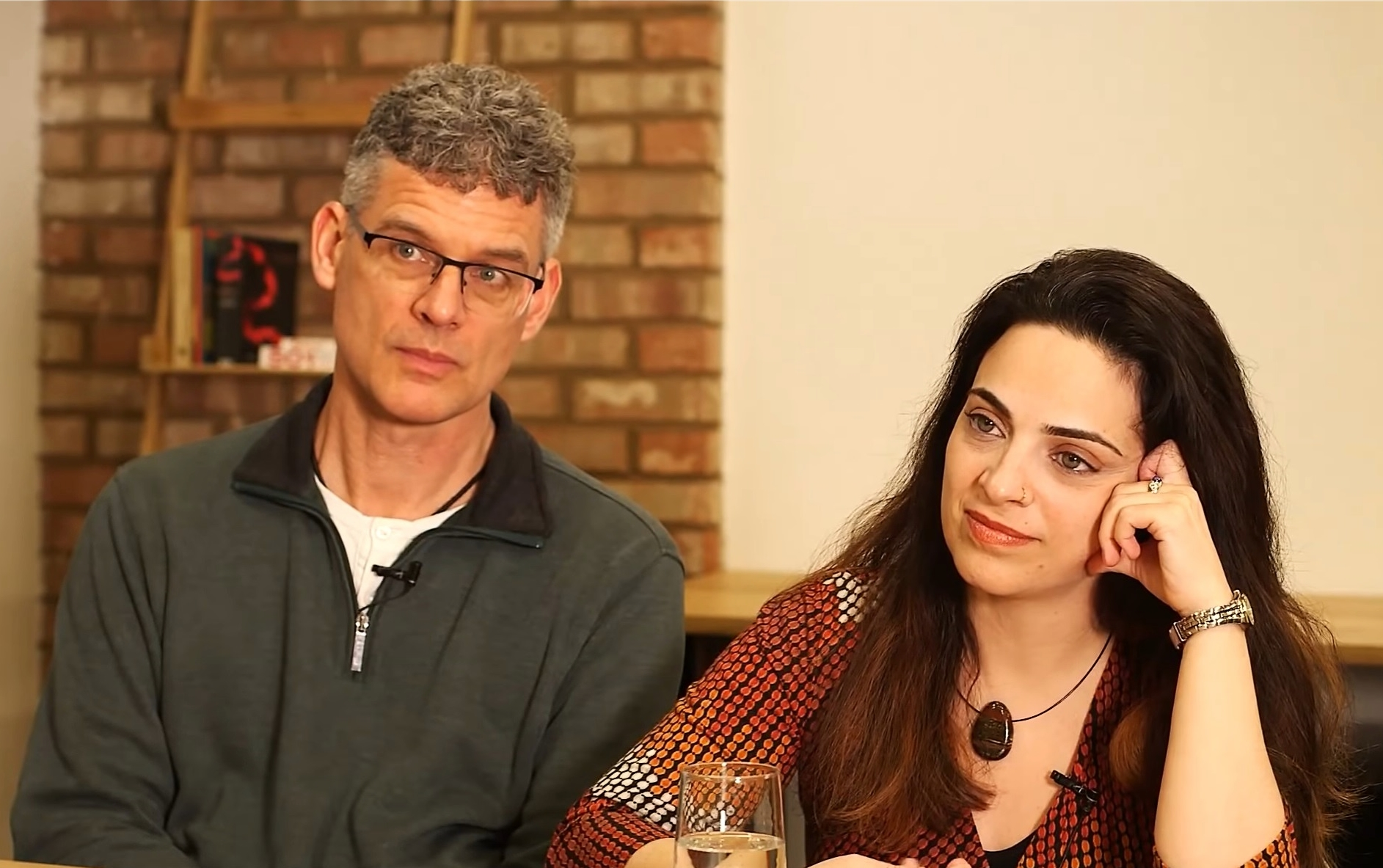
Miller and Diana Fleischman in 2019

On November 29, 2019, he married fellow American evolutionary psychologist Diana Fleischman. The couple had earlier appeared together in an interview, advocating for polyamory. They had their first child together in the spring of 2022.

== Research ==
=== Human evolution ===
Miller's 2000 book, The Mating Mind: How Sexual Choice Shaped the Evolution of Human Nature, proposes that human mate choices, courtship behavior, behavior genetics, psychometrics, and life cycle patterns support the survival value of traits related to sexual selection, such as art, morality, language, and creativity. According to Miller, the adaptive design features of these traits suggest that they evolved through mutual mate choice by both sexes to advertise heritable fitness.

=== Behavior ===
Miller's clinical interests are the application of fitness indicator theory to understand the symptoms, demographics, and behavior genetics of schizophrenia and mood disorders. His other interests include the origins of human preferences, aesthetics, utility functions, human strategic behavior, game theory, experiment-based economics, the ovulatory effects on female mate preferences, and the intellectual legacies of Darwin, Friedrich Nietzsche, and Thorstein Veblen.

In 2007, Miller (with Joshua Tybur and Brent Jordan) published an article in Evolution and Human Behavior, concluding, based on a sample size of eighteen strippers at a club in Albuquerque, New Mexico, over a two-month period, that lap dancers make more money during ovulation. For this paper, Miller won the 2008 Ig Nobel Award in Economics.

In his 2009 book, Spent: Sex, Evolution and the Secrets of Consumerism, Miller attempts to apply Darwinism to consumerism, arguing that marketing has exploited our inherited instincts to display social status for reproductive advantage. He makes the claim that marketing persuades people—particularly the young—that the most effective way to display social status is through consumption choices, rather than conveying traits such as intelligence and personality through direct communication. Miller states that marketing limits its own success by simplistically emphasizing wealth and status over kindness, creativity, or intelligence.

In 2019, Miller self-published a collection of his own essays about virtue signalling, titled Virtue Signaling: Essays on Darwinian Politics & Free Speech.

== Controversy ==
In June 2013, controversy arose after Miller tweeted: "Dear obese PhD applicants: if you didn't have the willpower to stop eating carbs, you won't have the willpower to do a dissertation #truth". Miller faced criticism from some students and faculty that he perpetuated the social stigma of obesity. He later released an apology and said that it was part of a "research project". Institutional review boards at the University of New Mexico, Miller's home university, and New York University, where he was a visiting professor, released statements saying that Miller's tweet was "self-promotional" and cannot be considered research. Miller was taken off all admissions committees for the remainder of the year and required to complete a sensitivity training project, meet with the department chair, and apologize to his colleagues. The University of New Mexico formally censured Miller in August 2013.

== Bibliography ==
- The Mating Mind: How Sexual Choice Shaped the Evolution of Human Nature. Heinemann. 2000. ISBN 0-434-00741-2.
- Mating Intelligence: Sex, Relationships, and the Mind's Reproductive System. Psychology Press. 2007. ISBN 978-0-805-85749-8.
- Geher; Geoffrey Miller (eds), Mating Intelligence: Sex, Relationships, and the Mind's Reproductive System, New York: Lawrence Erlbaum Associates, 2008.
- Spent: Sex, Evolution, and Consumer Behavior. Viking. 2009. ISBN 978-0-670-02062-1.
- Max, Tucker; Miller, Geoffrey (2015). Mate: Become the Man Women Want. Little, Brown and Company. ISBN 9780316375368.
- Miller, Geoffrey (2019). Virtue Signaling: Essays on Darwinian Politics & Free Speech. Cambrian Moon. ISBN 978-1951555009.
