= Daniel MacArthur =

Australian geneticist

- Citizenship: Australian
- Education: University of Sydney
- Known for: Genome Aggregation Database, 1000 Genomes Project
- Awards: American Society of Human Genetics Early Career Award, European Society of Human Genetics Award

Daniel Geoffrey MacArthur is an Australian geneticist who is currently serving as the director of the Centre for Population Genomics (CPG) in Darlinghurst, Australia.

== Education and career ==
MacArthur completed his undergraduate and PhD in biomedical science at the University of Sydney before moving to postdoctoral studies at the Wellcome Trust Sanger Institute in Cambridge, UK. During this time, MacArthur was involved in the 1000 Genomes Project. He then took up a faculty position at Harvard Medical School, Massachusetts General Hospital, and the Broad Institute of MIT and Harvard in Boston to build a new research team in a recently established department led by Mark Daly. During his time at the Broad Institute, led the development of the Exome Aggregation Consortium (ExAC) - later known as The Genome Aggregation Database (gnomAD) - in 2014. gnomAD is now the world's largest publicly available collection of human DNA variation, spanning over 800,000 individuals.

MacArthur left the Broad Institute as he moved to Australia to lead the CPG, a joint initiative between the Garvan Institute of Medical Research and the Murdoch Children's Research Institute, in 2020.

== Awards ==
- American Society of Human Genetics Early Career Award (2017)
- European Society of Human Genetics Award (2025)
