= Evolutionary Behavioral Sciences =

- Discipline: Evolutionary Psychology
- Language: English
- Edited by: Catherine Salmon

Publication details
- Former name(s): Journal of Social, Evolutionary, and Cultural Psychology
- History: 2007-present
- Publisher: American Psychological Association (United States)
- Frequency: Quarterly

Standard abbreviations
- ISO 4: Evol. Behav. Sci.

Indexing
- ISSN: 2330-2925 (print); 2330-2933 (web)

Links
- Journal homepage; Online access

Evolutionary Behavioral Sciences is a quarterly peer-reviewed academic journal published by the American Psychological Association. It was established in 2007 as the Journal of Social, Evolutionary, and Cultural Psychology, and obtained its current name in January 2014. EBS publishes manuscripts that advance the study of human behavior from an evolutionary perspective, with an emphasis on work that integrates evolutionary theory with other approaches and perspectives from across the behavioral sciences. The journal is published in partnership with the NorthEastern Evolutionary Psychology Society.

== Abstracting and indexing ==
The journal is abstracted and indexed in Academic Search Complete, International Bibliography of the Social Sciences, PsycINFO, and Scopus.

== Editors ==
The current editor-in-chief is Catherine Salmon (University of Redlands).
