= Shopper marketing =

Shopper marketing is "a discipline that focuses on the customer experience and the customer journey." It focuses on the consumer's path to purchasing a product, from first being aware of the product, to consideration and through to the purchase of it. It separates itself from retail marketing which focuses on engaging the customer in-store only.

Shopper marketing is not limited to in-store marketing activities, a common and inaccurate assumption that impairs the spread of any industry definition. Shopper marketing is part of an overall integrated marketing approach that considers the needs and wants of a particular "shopper" in order to drive consumption. Shopper insight data collected by shopper marketers includes the consideration of their shopper needs, preferred retail environments and in-store activity.

Unilever defines shopper insight as a "focus on the process that takes place between that first thought the consumer has about purchasing an item, all the way through the selection of that item." They describe it as the analysis of consumer behavior and decision-making from the moment they consider buying a product until they choose it. It aims to understand the motivations, preferences, and influences that affect the shopping experience and outcome.

== Description ==
Manufacturers can develop strategic plans using high-quality shopper marketing data, allowing for a clear understanding of consumer preferences and behaviours. According to industry studies prior to 2010, manufacturer investment in shopper marketing is growing more than 21% annually.

According to the company's financial statements, Procter & Gamble, invests at least 500 million dollars in shopper marketing each year.

Shopper marketing is practiced by leading European companies such as Unilever and Beiersdorf, and the discipline is developed further by the likes of Phenomena Group, Europe's first shopper marketing agency.

The following statistics have caused the reapportionment of marketing investment from consumer marketing to shopper marketing. Each brand performs differently based on shopper need states, shopper trip types, retailer formats, brand importance, brand relevance and a host of other factors:

- 70% of brand selections are made at stores
- 68% of buying decisions are unplanned
- 5% are loyal to the brand of one product group
- Practitioners believe that effective shopper marketing is increasingly important to achieve success in the marketplace

== Partial areas ==
=== History ===
For almost 50 years, large-scale consumer packaged goods manufacturers had many possibilities available to spark continued business growth:

- 1970s: product commoditisation
- 1980s: channel consolidation
- 1990s: increased consumerism
- 2000s: globalisation.

The organisation itself was structured accordingly to maximise growth agents through the efficiencies of mass production, distribution and sales. Marketers were organised into silos depending on which function they served:

- Product marketers developed and positioned goods for retailers to sell
- Distribution marketers took several product brands and managed lifecycle and supply chain issues by channel
- Consumer-driven marketers who were in the field among the channel(s) increased share or penetration

The marketing organisation structure was originally built around the four Ps of marketing: product, price, placement and promotion. The four Ps of marketing were a product of the 1950s. The inward facing organisational structure of marketing ceased after the 1950s. Businesses no longer manufactured products with limited information provided to consumers. Marketing was used as a tool to became more consumer centric to customers who were privy to more information about products before purchase.

=== Retail shopping environment ===
In late 2004, a new growth model emerged as product manufacturers and retailers alike identified the need to uniquely influence the shopping experience. It was called shopper marketing (SM). It wasn't until 2010 that it was formally defined by the Retail Commission on Shopper Marketing as follows:

"Shopper Marketing is the use of insights-driven marketing and merchandising initiatives to satisfy the needs of targeted shoppers, enhance the shopping experience and improve business results and brand equity for retailers and manufacturers.”

== Buying behaviour data ==
Several different data collection methods provide information on the shopper's buying behaviour of a given brand: observations, intercepts, focus groups, diaries, point-of-sale and other data.

Observations made before entering a store, in the store, and after exiting a store clarify when, what, where, why, who and how shopper behaviour occurs.

Key insights into consumers include: the length of the buying process, the items the shopper noticed, touched, and studied, the items the shopper bought, as well as the purchase methods influencing the process. Interviews help uncover motives guiding buying behaviours. The matters commonly clarified are: the likelihood of product substitution and the identification of substitutes; values and attitudes; desires and motivational factors; as well as lifestyle and life situation. Point-of-sale data provide information on which products were bought, when and for how much (and sometimes by whom when a frequent shopper card can be used).

Another influence is the amount of other shoppers are in a store at a given time. For example, research by Martin (2012) in a retailing context found that male and female shoppers who were accidentally touched from behind by other shoppers left a store earlier than people who had not been touched and evaluated brands more negatively, resulting in the Accidental Interpersonal Touch effect

== Segmenting shoppers ==
When conducting shopper segmenting, the market is divided into essential and measurable groups, that is, segments on the basis of the buying behaviour data. Shopper segmenting makes it easier to answer the requirements of individual segments. For example, price-sensitive and traditional shoppers clearly differ from one another as far as their buying behaviour is concerned. Segmenting makes it possible to target marketing measures at the most profitable shoppers. The value of segmenting shoppers is debated in the shopper marketing industry. For retailers it can provide direction on positioning relative to competitors as well as in terms of store locations. Loyalty cards can provide one of the richest sources of segmentation data. For consumer product manufacturers, shopper segmentation is less useful, at least in physical stores, as the shelf and displays communicate to all store shoppers in the same way.
