= McKinney (advertising agency) =

Advertising agency

- Industry: Advertising, Marketing, Experiential Marketing, Media, Strategy
- Founded: 1969
- Founders: Charles McKinney; Mike Silver
- Headquarters: Durham, North Carolina; Los Angeles, California; New York, New York
- Area served: Global
- Parent: Cheil Worldwide
- Website: mckinney.com

McKinney is an advertising agency based in Durham, North Carolina, with offices in Los Angeles, New York City, Dallas-Fort Worth, and Phoenix.

== History ==
The agency was founded in 1969 as McKinney & Silver by Charles "Chick" McKinney & Mike Silver. The agency was later renamed McKinney and has been part of Cheil Worldwide since 2012.

McKinney moved from Raleigh, North Carolina, to the American Tobacco Campus in Durham, NC in 2004. Ten years later, McKinney CEO Brad Brinegar appeared in the short documentary "Because No One Else Would," which was produced by Goodtree & Company and Horizon Productions to celebrate the restoration anniversary of the American Tobacco factory.

In 2012, McKinney was named the most effective independent agency in the world by the Effie Awards and Warc. In 2013, McKinney's creation of the Mezamashii Run Project for its client, Mizuno, led to that company being recognized as the most effective brand in North America.

In 2013, following the purchase by Cheil, McKinney opened an office in New York. In 2019, the agency expanded to the West Coast and opened an office in Los Angeles with the acquisition of the Operam Creative Group.

McKinney was named one of 10 agencies to watch by Ad Age in 2015. Also in 2015, McKinney Chief Creative Officer Jonathan Cude was named to the Adweek 50 List of Vital Leaders in Tech, Media and Marketing.

McKinney created the Joni Madison Mtern Diversity Scholarship in 2016, in honor of the agency’s long-time COO who now holds that position at the Human Rights Campaign, the largest LGBTQ advocacy group and political lobbying organization in the United States. In 2017, the 4As named Group Creative Director Jenny Nicholson to its list of 100 People Who Make Advertising Great and in 2018 McKinney created the Startup Stampede in partnership with the American Underground, a Google Tech Hub.

In 2018, Joe Maglio was named CEO of McKinney, with Brad Brinegar (CEO from 2002–2018) remaining as chairman.

== Notable campaigns ==
- Where is my Gnome? – Travelocity
- The Art of the Heist – Audi
- College Football Championship – ESPN
- No One Gets a Diploma Alone – Ad Council
- Family Hub: Birthday Party – for Samsung Electronics. One of a series of commercials produced from 2014-2016 with Dax Shepard and his wife, Kristen Bell
- SPENT – Urban Ministries of Durham. An online experience depicting life on the brink of homelessness that has received 10 million views since 2011.
- Getting Greenie – CarMax
- Payback – Next Gen Personal Finance
- Competitive Sleeping League — Marpac
- Stop HB2 – Equality NC and Human Rights Campaign
