= The Franki Show =

The Franki Show is a web series created and produced by indie duo filmmakers Bonnie Carter and Joey Harrison. The program is a Webby Honoree and winner of the best drama award presented by the National Association of Television Program Executives at the second annual LATV Next TV Competition.
