= Paul Irwing =

British psychologist

- Known for: gender differences
- Scientific career
- Fields: Psychology
- Workplaces: Manchester

Paul Irwing is a Reader in organisational psychology at the University of Manchester. He has been a member of the editorial board of the Journal of Intelligence and a Fellow of the Royal Society of Medicine. Paul Irwing has published research on gender differences in six articles in Intelligence, two articles in the British Journal of Psychology and one article in Nature. He has a total of 70+ publications, including 31 journal articles.
