= Human Diversity Foundation =

Far-right organization

- Successor: Polygenic Scores LLC
- Founded: 2022
- Type: Limited liability company
- Purpose: Scientific racism, eugenics, white nationalism
- Location: Registered in Wyoming
- Origins: Pioneer Fund
- Region served: Europe, United States
- Key people: Emil Kirkegaard, Matthew Frost, Erik Ahrens

The Human Diversity Foundation (HDF) is a far-right for-profit company founded in 2022 to publish "race science", a pseudoscientific belief in support of racism and eugenics. Its publications are presented through the Aporia Magazine and Mankind Quarterly. It also publishes Edward Dutton's The Jolly Heretic podcast. Key persons of the HDF including its founder support remigration and white nationalism.

In April 2025, the organization was legally renamed Polygenic Scores LLC.

== History ==
The Human Diversity Foundation was founded by Emil Kirkegaard, a Danish far-right activist, under his legal name William Engman in 2022. It was registered as a limited liability company in Wyoming, US. The other HDF leaders are Matthew Frost, a British former teacher and founder of the Aporia Magazine, and Erik Ahrens, a German white nationalist and social media advisor for the far-right party Alternative für Deutschland (AfD). The Human Diversity Foundation is a rebrand of the Pioneer Fund. According to Matthew Frost, assets from the Pioneer Fund were inherited by Emil Kirkegaard and used for the HDF.

Emil Kirkegaard leads an "underground research wing" of the HDF consisting of about 10 researchers. Members of the HDF research team include Bryan Pesta, Bo Winegard and Davide Piffer. Pesta, who had received money from the Pioneer Fund, was dismissed from his position at Cleveland State University in 2022 for misusing genetic data in his research. Piffer's writing about race and intelligence was cited by Payton Gendron, perpetrator of the 2022 Buffalo shooting. Another employee of HDF is Edward Dutton, a former editor-in-chief of Mankind Quarterly and racist YouTuber who promotes eugenics. Dutton has suggested that Black people "don’t do very well academically and don't behave very well either". Dutton was fired from his position at the University of Oulu for plagiarising a student's dissertation. HDF has funded a research paper authored by Russell T. Warne.

In October 2024, The Guardian newspaper revealed that Andrew Conru, an American businessman, had donated more than a million US dollars to HDF. According to their reporting, "After being approached by the Guardian, Conru pulled his support, saying the group appeared to have deviated from its original mission of 'non-partisan academic research'."

=== Neo Byzantium ===
HDF plans to create a private far-right club called Neo Byzantium to obtain income. Membership starts at £650 and rises to £5,000. It was to be led by Erik Ahrens and Matthew Frost.

=== UK Biobank controversy ===
In October 2024, journalists from The Guardian reported that Emil Kirkegaard and HDF had accessed UK Biobank data. Hidden camera footage revealed Matthew Frost in 2023 claiming that "they've managed to get access to the UK Biobank," and to know more "talk to Emil". In response, a UK Biobank representative commented that they have "continued to monitor and prevent attempts to access the resource by Kirkegaard and other researchers believed to be connected with him". The representative also commented that HDF are "not bona fide researchers".

== Publications ==
=== Aporia Magazine ===
HDF operates the online magazine Aporia. Matthew Frost founded Aporia in 2021 and sold it to Emil Kirkegaard. Frost has stated that the magazine should be read "by the elite, people aspiring to the elite".

Diana Fleischman is its podcast host. She attended the 2023 Natal Conference with members of the New Right. Bo Winegard, Aporia's executive editor, stated that he believed racial stereotypes were "reasonably accurate" and requested that his readers embrace "white identity politics". Winegard was dismissed from his position at Marietta College. In 2020, Winegard published a retracted paper which drew on Richard Lynn's flawed IQ data. Winegard's race and intelligence research was criticized for resembling pseudoscience.

Noah Carl, editor of Aporia, was sacked from the University of Cambridge over allegations that he had collaborated with far-right extremists.

White nationalist Jared Taylor appeared on the Aporia podcast in 2024 to complain about multiracial societies. He commented that "there is no possibility of blacks and whites living peacefully together".

=== Mankind Quarterly ===
HDF have stated that they own Mankind Quarterly. It has been described as a "pseudo-scholarly outlet for promoting racial inequality".

=== The Jolly Heretic ===
HDF publishes Edward Dutton's The Jolly Heretic podcast and newsletter. Dutton is reported to be on the HDF payroll at approximately $40,000 per year. In November 2023, The Jolly Heretic earned US$62,400 in annual revenue which was put into the HDF. The podcast includes documentaries and interviews from Dutton. In May 2024, Dutton released 1492, a documentary about Muslim rule in medieval Europe, with the full documentary viewable only by paid subscribers. In the documentary Dutton compares the Muslim conquest of the Iberian Peninsula in the 700s to contemporary Muslim immigration to Europe.

== Far-right activism ==
HDF plans to create a white-only ethnostate by forcibly expelling non-ethnically European minorities, a tactic they describe as "remigration". This term has become a popular euphemism in recent years among far-right political groups in Germany and Austria to refer to the mass deportation of minorities. HDF has connections to the German far-right political party Alternative for Germany (AfD). HDF Leader Matthew Frost has stated that AfD's key policy should be remigration if the party were to take power. Kirkegaard suggested that families that had settled for two or three generations should be paid to leave.

Erik Ahrens, an HDF leader, has defended the Waffen-SS and has stated that he wants to create a home for "white, Christian people", as he believes they are under threat from immigration. Ahrens has commented that "[his] vision is to one day run in Germany, in a Trump-like fashion", adding "It hasn't been done for 100 years, to run a populist movement centred around a person. I was looking for who can be this, and I probably have to go into that role."

== See also ==
- Human Biodiversity Institute
- Great replacement conspiracy theory
- White genocide conspiracy theory

Similar publications

- American Renaissance (magazine)
- The Occidental Quarterly
- The Unz Review
- VDARE
