= Spent: Sex, Evolution, and Consumer Behavior =

2009 book by Geoffrey Miller

- Author: Geoffrey Miller
- Language: English
- Subject: Marketing, consumer behavior
- Publisher: Viking Press
- Publication date: 2009
- Publication place: U.S.
- Pages: 374
- ISBN: 978-0-670-02062-1

Spent: Sex, Evolution, and Consumer Behavior is a 2009 book by Geoffrey Miller.

The book presents an evolutionary analysis of marketing, arguing that consumers seek pleasure and seek to display favorable traits to others.
