= Jan te Nijenhuis =

Dutch psychologist

- Education: Groningen University, Free University of Amsterdam
- Scientific career
- Fields: Psychology
- Institutions: University of Amsterdam
- Thesis: Comparability of test scores for immigrants and majority group members in the Netherlands (1997)

Jan te Nijenhuis is a Dutch psychologist. He is a lecturer of psychology at the University of Amsterdam, known for his research on human intelligence. He studied at Groningen University and the Free University of Amsterdam.

His publications on the intelligence of immigrants have provoked a lot of criticism and controversy in the Netherlands.

He has controversially published several papers in the Mankind Quarterly which is widely regarded as a racist pseudoscience journal and has attended the London Conference on Intelligence.

In June 2019, te Nijenhuis spoke at a meeting of the JFVD, the youth association of the far-right FvD party.
