= Hominoid Personality Questionnaire =

Personality rating instrument for non-human primates

The Hominoid Personality Questionnaire (also: HPQ) is a personality rating instrument used for non-human primates. It is an extended version of the Orangutan Personality Questionnaire, which was an extended version of King and Figueredo's Chimpanzee Personality Questionnaire. The HPQ has been used to assess personality in non-human primate species (e.g. chimpanzees, orangutans, rhesus macaques).

The HPQ contains 54 adjectives followed by a description. Forty-one items were taken from the 75 items of Goldberg's "Big Five". Examples include Dominant, Sympathetic, Helpful, Sensitive, Submissive, Dependent, Independent, Fearful, Decisive, Timid, Cautious, Intelligent, Persistent.

== Additional reading ==
- Dutton, D (2008). "Subjective assessment of chimpanzee (Pan troglodytes) personality: reliability and stability of trait ratings". Primates; Journal of Primatology. 49 (4): 253–259. doi:10.1007/s10329-008-0094-1. PMID 18668303. S2CID 2039046.
- Freeman, H.; Gosling, S. (2010). "Personality in nonhuman primates: a review and evaluation of past research". American Journal of Primatology. 72 (8): 653–671. doi:10.1002/ajp.20833. PMID 20568079. S2CID 37143571.
- Gosling, S. D.; John, O. P. (1999). "Personality Dimensions in Nonhuman Animals: A Cross-Species Review". Current Directions in Psychological Science. 8 (3): 69–75. doi:10.1111/1467-8721.00017. S2CID 145716504.
- King, J. E., Murray, L., & Weiss, A. D. (2011). Personality and temperament in nonhuman primates. New York : Springer, c2011.
- Santillán-Doherty, A.; Muñóz-Delgado, J.; Arenas, R.; Márquez, A.; Cortés, J. (2006). "Reliability of a method to measure novelty-seeking in nonhuman primates". American Journal of Primatology. 68 (11): 1098–1113. doi:10.1002/ajp.20310. PMID 17044009. S2CID 44805070.
- Weiss, A.; Inoue-Murayama, M.; Hong, K.; Inoue, E.; Udono, T.; Ochiai, T.; King, J. (2009). "Assessing chimpanzee personality and subjective well-being in Japan". American Journal of Primatology. 71 (4): 283–292. doi:10.1002/ajp.20649. PMID 19199350. S2CID 9207436.
- Weiss, A.; King, J. E.; Perkins, L. (2006). "Personality and subjective well-being in orangutans (Pongo pygmaeus and Pongo abelii)". Journal of Personality and Social Psychology. 90 (3): 501–511. doi:10.1037/0022-3514.90.3.501. PMID 16594834.
- Weiss, A.; King, J.; Hopkins, W. (2007). "A cross-setting study of chimpanzee (Pan troglodytes) personality structure and development: zoological parks and Yerkes National Primate Research Center". American Journal of Primatology. 69 (11): 1264–1277. doi:10.1002/ajp.20428. PMC 2654334. PMID 17397036.
