= Spent (video game) =

Online game about surviving poverty and homelessness

- Developer: McKinney
- Publisher: McKinney
- Platform: Browser
- Release: February 2011

Spent (stylized SPENT) is an online game about poverty and homelessness. It was developed by advertising agency McKinney for their pro bono client Urban Ministries of Durham (UMD), a nonprofit organization in Durham, North Carolina that provides services to those in poverty. Players must make the difficult decisions necessary to live for one month on $1000, often having to choose between equally disagreeable options, such as a healthy meal and working electricity, or covering the minimum on credit cards and paying the rent.

Spent was released for browser and mobile in February 2011. As of 2014, it has been played more than 4 million times.

== Gameplay ==
The player, a single parent in poverty, is given $1,000 to live on for one month; they must then select employment, each of which pays minimum wage. The goal is to end the month with some money left over. Throughout the game's one-month period, the player must make difficult decisions relating to housing, utilities, groceries, and lifestyle decisions, among others, to ensure their survival for at least the month, many of which have negative long-term consequences. For example, choosing to not renew vehicle registration (that costs a large sum of money) can lead to the player being pulled over, with the choice of paying fees or spending a work day attending court, which adds a job strike (the player gets fired from their job after the third strike), an additional long-term expense, and a reduced payday. Players have the option to use their real-life social media connections on platforms such as Facebook and Twitter to ask a friend for assistance, serving as organic advertising for the website and personalizing the experience.

Certain decisions include short messages providing information about real statistics and poverty-related struggles. For example, after deciding whether to live closer to work (where the rent is high, but the transportation costs low) or to live further from work (where the rent is less expensive, but the transportation costs are much higher), the player is shown the message "A lack of affordable housing is the number one cause of homelessness."

The game ends when the player either runs out of money before the end of the month, makes it through with money left over, or chooses to end the game manually. The end screen notes that rent is still due and invites the player to "help someone living Spent today" by learning more about UMD and donating to the organization.

== Development ==
McKinney’s 11-member development team noted tens of millions of people each month played social network games like FarmVille and Mafia Wars. They suspected that the characteristics of these games could be used to educate people about the reality of poverty and homelessness. The team conducted focus groups with UMD caseworkers and the people assisted by them to research the factors necessary to construct the situations in Spent.

Spent uses real-life statistics as features, such as Durham’s fair market rent values to determine the game's housing prices.

Donors have said the organization had endured many tough years to deliver the game.

== Release and acclaim ==
Spent was released in February 2011. The game raised $45,000 from 25,000 new UMD donors in just over 10 months, and received praise from CNN, ABC, and Fast Company for its ability to increase awareness of poverty in an immersive social media setting.

In September 2011, McKinney and UMD launched a petition to members of the United States Congress to take ten minutes playing the game in order to "experience the challenges that more than 14 million Americans are facing".

As of December 2013, the game continued to get about 5,000 new plays each day. An HTML version was released in July 2014.

Almost 2 million people had spent an average of 11:46 on the site.

The SPENT simulation has been used in higher education to teach family and consumer sciences students about poverty.
