= 2011 Webby Awards =

US internet awards ceremony

The 15th annual 2011 Webby Awards were held on June 13, 2011 in New York City. The show was hosted by Lisa Kudrow and was streamed live via Facebook, The Huffington Post and Funny or Die. The Webby for lifetime achievement was awarded to former Motorola executive, Martin Cooper.

== Nominees and winners ==
(from http://www.webbyawards.com/winners/2011)

Category	Webby Award winner	People's Voice winner	Other nominees
Games	Lego Star Wars III (Archived 11 June 2011 via Wayback); RED Interactive Agency	Robot Unicorn Attack (Archived 14 June 2011 via Wayback); Adult Swim Games	CityVille (http://www.facebook.com/pages/CityVille/168232079864416?ref=ts); Zynga
Games	Lego Star Wars III (Archived 11 June 2011 via Wayback); RED Interactive Agency	Robot Unicorn Attack (Archived 14 June 2011 via Wayback); Adult Swim Games	Petpet Park (Archived 14 June 2011 via Wayback); MTV Networks/Nickelodeon
Games	Lego Star Wars III (Archived 11 June 2011 via Wayback); RED Interactive Agency	Robot Unicorn Attack (Archived 14 June 2011 via Wayback); Adult Swim Games	Time explorer (Archived 24 May 2011 via Wayback); British Museum
Games-Related	The Escapist (Archived 11 June 2011 via Wayback); Themis Media		GameFly.com (Archived 15 June 2011 via Wayback); GameFly, Inc.
Games-Related	The Escapist (Archived 11 June 2011 via Wayback); Themis Media		GameSpot (Archived 13 June 2011 via Wayback); GameSpot
Games-Related	The Escapist (Archived 11 June 2011 via Wayback); Themis Media		Halo Waypoint Website (Archived 17 July 2011 via Wayback); BLITZ
Games-Related	The Escapist (Archived 11 June 2011 via Wayback); Themis Media		Joystiq (Archived 13 June 2011 via Wayback); AOL
Mobile & Apps - Games-Handheld Devices	Angry Birds (Archived 12 June 2011 via Wayback); Rovio Mobile		AMCtv.com -- Mad Men Cocktail Culture App (Archived 3 June 2011 via Wayback); AMCtv.com
Mobile & Apps - Games-Handheld Devices	Angry Birds (Archived 12 June 2011 via Wayback); Rovio Mobile		Elmo's Monster Maker (Archived 10 May 2011 via Wayback); Sesame Workshop
Mobile & Apps - Games-Handheld Devices	Angry Birds (Archived 12 June 2011 via Wayback); Rovio Mobile		FarmVille on iPhone (Archived 19 May 2011 via Wayback); Zynga
Mobile & Apps - Games-Handheld Devices	Angry Birds (Archived 12 June 2011 via Wayback); Rovio Mobile		Fruit Ninja (Archived 14 June 2011 via Wayback); Halfbrick
Mobile & Apps - Games-Tablet & All Other Devices	Jambalaya (Archived 14 June 2011 via Wayback); Fastspot	Grover's Number Special (Archived 10 May 2011 via Wayback); Sesame Workshop	GoodieWords (Archived 11 May 2011 via Wayback); Rus Yusupov (Producer, Commercial Pop LLC), Adam Gittlin (Founder, What Is Properties LLC)
Mobile & Apps - Games-Tablet & All Other Devices	Jambalaya (Archived 14 June 2011 via Wayback); Fastspot	Grover's Number Special (Archived 10 May 2011 via Wayback); Sesame Workshop	Rhythm Racer II (Archived 13 June 2011 via Wayback); AvatarLabs
Mobile & Apps - Games-Tablet & All Other Devices	Jambalaya (Archived 14 June 2011 via Wayback); Fastspot	Grover's Number Special (Archived 10 May 2011 via Wayback); Sesame Workshop	TRON Legacy: Circuit Pulse (http://www.alternaterealitybranding.com/troncircuitpulse); 42 Entertainment
Interactive Advertising - Game or Application	Google Chrome Fastball (http://bbhgraze.com/awards/google_10/google_chrome_fastball/); BBH New York, Google Creative Lab	M&M's Find Red (Archived 20 April 2013 via Wayback); Proximity Canada	Balloonacy 2 (Archived 23 December 2011 via Wayback); Poke
Interactive Advertising - Game or Application	Google Chrome Fastball (http://bbhgraze.com/awards/google_10/google_chrome_fastball/); BBH New York, Google Creative Lab	M&M's Find Red (Archived 20 April 2013 via Wayback); Proximity Canada	Battle of the Cheetos (Archived 15 June 2011 via Wayback); Goodby, Silverstein & Partners
Interactive Advertising - Game or Application	Google Chrome Fastball (http://bbhgraze.com/awards/google_10/google_chrome_fastball/); BBH New York, Google Creative Lab	M&M's Find Red (Archived 20 April 2013 via Wayback); Proximity Canada	Create your own Paper Head (http://competitions.nomonday.com/case/paperheads/); Perfect Fools
This table is not complete, please help to complete it from material on this page.
