= William H. Tucker (psychologist) =

American psychologist (1940–2022)

William H. Tucker (1940–2022), also known as Bill Tucker, was an American psychologist. He was an Emeritus Professor of Psychology at Rutgers University and the author of several books critical of race science. He retired from Rutgers in 2009. Tucker died in 2022.

== Early life and education ==
Tucker received his bachelor's degree from Bates College in 1967, and his master's and doctorate from Princeton University. He joined the faculty at Rutgers University in 1970 and was there since. During his time as a student at Princeton, he was a member of the Students for a Democratic Society and participated in taking over buildings on campus.

== Career ==
Tucker was a Psychometric Fellow for three years at Princeton, a position subsidized by Educational Testing Service. The majority of Tucker's scholarship was about psychometrics, not in it. He sat on the advisory board of the Institute for the Study of Academic Racism.

Tucker wrote critical commentaries on several hereditarian psychologists known for their controversial work on race and intelligence. He won the Anisfield-Wolf Book Award in 1995, and received a fellowship from the National Endowment for the Humanities in 2006.

According to his website, "My research interests concern the use—or more properly the misuse—of social science to support oppressive social policies, especially in the area of race. I seek to explore how scientists in general, and psychologists in particular, have become involved with such issues and what effect their participation has produced."

== Publications ==
- Tucker WH (1994a). Fact and Fiction in the Discovery of Sir Cyril Burt's Flaws. Journal of the History of the Behavioral Sciences, 30, 335–347.
- Tucker WH (1994b). The Science and Politics of Racial Research. University of Illinois Press. ISBN 0-252-02099-5
- Tucker WH (1997). Re-reconsidering Burt: Beyond a reasonable doubt. Journal of the History of the Behavioral Sciences, 33, 145–162.
- Tucker WH (2002). The Funding of Scientific Racism: Wickliffe Draper and the Pioneer Fund. University of Illinois Press. ISBN 0-252-02762-0
- Tucker WH (2005). The Intelligence Controversy: A Guide to the Debates. ABC-Clio, Inc. ISBN 1-85109-409-1
- Tucker WH (2009). The Cattell Controversy: Race, Science, and Ideology, University of Illinois Press
- Tucker WH (2015). Princeton Radicals of the 1960s, Then and Now. MacFarland
- Tucker WH (2024). 'The Bell Curve' in Perspective: Race, Meritocracy, Inequality and Politics, Palgrave
