= Diane Winston =

American professor of media and religion

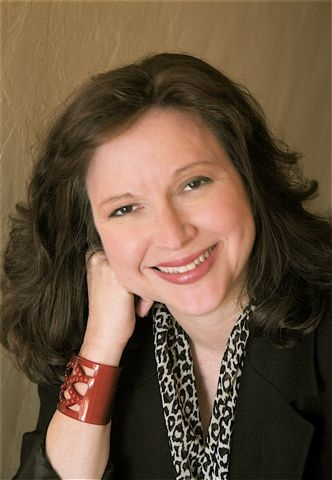
- Born: December 28, 1951 (age 74)
- Education: Brandeis; Harvard Divinity School; Columbia; Princeton University
- Occupations: Professor of media and religion
- Employer: University of Southern California

Diane Winston is an American professor of Media and Religion at the Annenberg School for Communication and Journalism at the University of Southern California (USC), and an author. USC lists her current research interests as media coverage of Islam, Religion, New religious movement, New media, and the place of religion in American identity.

She received her B.A. from Brandeis, a master's degree in Theological Studies from Harvard Divinity School, a master's in journalism from Columbia, and her Ph.D. in religion from Princeton University.

She has previously worked as a journalist at The Baltimore Sun, Dallas Times Herald, and The News and Observer in Raleigh, North Carolina.

She has written about the Salvation Army, and has been interviewed by the news media about the interrelationships of religion and modern culture.

== Bibliography ==
- Boozers, brass bands, and hallejlujah lassies: the Salvation Army and American commercial culture, 1880-1918, Princeton University, 1996
- Red Hot and Righteous: The Urban Religion of the Salvation Army, Harvard University Press, 2000, ISBN 0-674-00396-9
- Co-editor, Faith in the Market: Religion and the Rise of Urban Commercial Culture, Rutgers University Press, 2002, ISBN 0-8135-3099-7
- Editor and Author, Small Screen, Big Picture: Television and Lived Religion, Baylor University Press, 2009, ISBN 1-60258-185-1
