= Wickliffe Draper =

American political activist (1891–1972)

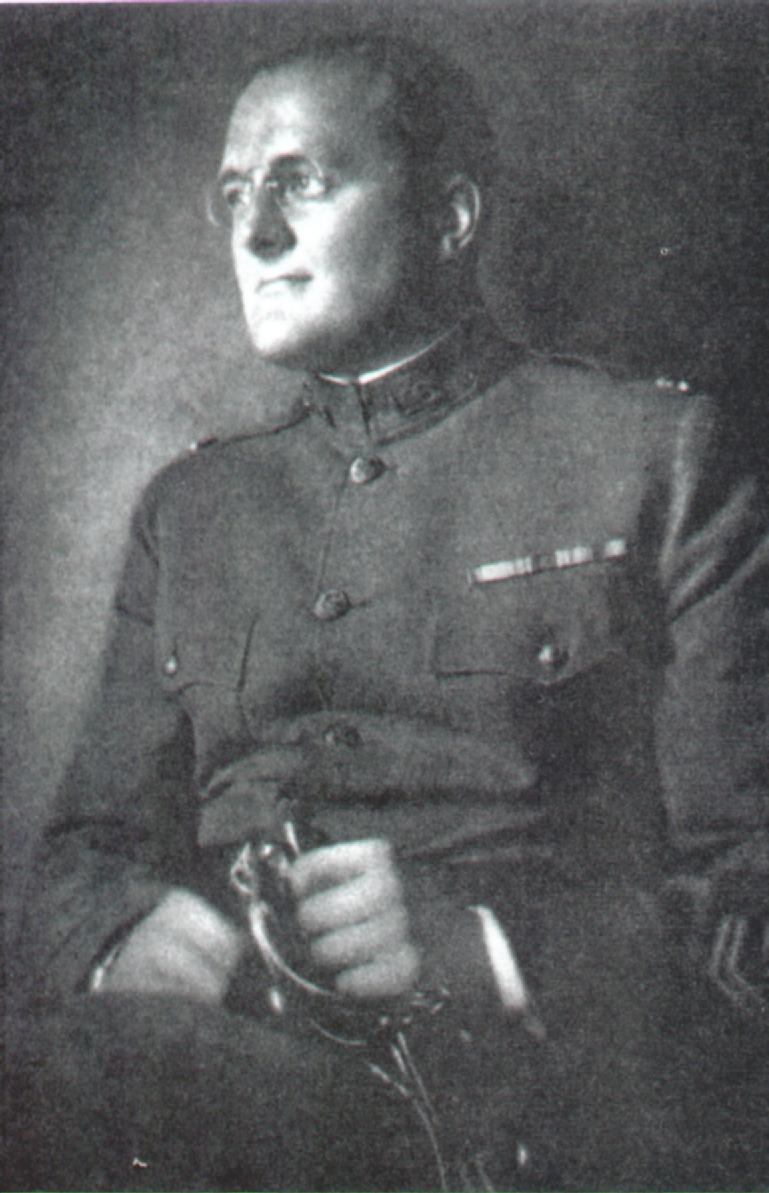
- Wickliffe Draper, in United States military uniform
- Born: August 9, 1891; Hopedale, Massachusetts, U.S.
- Died: March 11, 1972 (aged 80); United States
- Education: St. Mark's School (Massachusetts), Harvard University
- Occupation: Political activist
- Known for: Advocate for eugenics and racial segregation: Founder of Pioneer Fund
- Parent: George A. Draper
- Relatives: Eben Sumner Draper (uncle); Preston Brown (cousin)

Wickliffe Preston Draper (August 9, 1891 – March 11, 1972) was an American political activist. He was an ardent eugenicist and lifelong advocate of strict racial segregation. In 1937, he founded the Pioneer Fund for eugenics and heredity research; he later became its principal benefactor.

== Early life and education ==
Draper was born on August 9, 1891, in Hopedale, Massachusetts. He was the son and heir of Jessie Fremont Preston Draper, daughter of Confederate Brigadier General William Preston III, who had served as the United States Ambassador to Spain, until the American Civil War and George A. Draper, owner of Draper Looms textile and textile machinery manufacturers, who descended from generations of prominent Americans. He attended St. Mark's School in Southborough, Massachusetts, graduating in the class of 1909. While at St. Mark's, Draper received the Ely Prize for extemporaneous speaking and the Burnett History Prize from William Greenough Thayer, the headmaster at the time.

Draper graduated from Harvard University in 1913. When the United States was slow to enter World War I, he joined the Royal Field Artillery, commissioned as a second lieutenant in the British Army. In early March of 1915, Draper took part in an artillery assault on the German lines to make way for a British advance in the Artois region of France. When the U.S. eventually declared war, he transferred to the U.S. Army.

== Postwar ==
In 1924, Draper established the Draper Armor Leadership Award, as a means to competitively test the leadership of small Cavalry units in the US Army. The test was oriented to the platoon level of Horse Cavalry. The first Cavalry Leadership Test for small units was held at Fort Riley, Kansas, then home of the Cavalry School. In 1928, Lieutenant Commander Draper established a trust fund of $35,000 to perpetuate the award.

In 1927, he participated in the French mission of Captain Marcel Augiéras to the southern Sahara that discovered the remains of "Asselar man", an extinct human believed to belong to the Holocene, or Recent Epoch. Some scholars consider it the oldest known skeleton of a black African. The French Société de Géographie subsequently awarded him its 1932 gold medal, the Grande Médaille d'Or des Explorations, and in Britain, he was elected a Fellow of the Royal Geographical Society. After the war, he traveled and went on numerous safaris. His large New York City apartment was reportedly filled with mounted trophies.

== Eugenics and Pioneer Fund ==
During this time, Draper became interested in eugenics, which had been a popular movement in the United States during the first three decades of the 20th century. However, by the early 1930s, interest had begun to fade as the underlying science came under question. Groups like the American Eugenics Society (AES) faced declining membership and dwindling treasuries. Draper had helped ease the funding shortfall, making a special gift to the AES of several thousand dollars to support the society prior to 1932.

In August 1935, Draper traveled to Berlin to attend the International Congress for the Scientific Investigation of Population Problems. Presiding over the conference was Wilhelm Frick, the German Minister of the Interior. At the conference, Draper's travel companion, Dr. Clarence Campbell delivered an oration that concluded: "The difference between the Jew and the Aryan is as unsurmountable [sic] as that between black and white.... Germany has set a pattern which other nations must follow.... To that great leader, Adolf Hitler!"

Three years later, when Draper paid to print and disseminate the book White America by Earnest Sevier Cox, an advocate of white supremacy and racial segregation, a personal copy was delivered to Frick.

In 1937, Draper established the Pioneer Fund, a foundation intended to give scholarships to descendants of White American colonial-era families and to support research into "race betterment" through eugenics. The scholarships were never given, but the first project of the fund was to distribute two documentary films from Nazi Germany depicting its claimed success with eugenics. The Pioneer Fund was headed by the sociologist and eugenicist Harry H. Laughlin, an advocate for restrictive immigration laws and national programs of compulsory sterilization of the mentally ill and intellectually disabled.

At age 50, Draper again volunteered for military service and was assigned a post with British military intelligence in India during World War II. After the war, he returned to eugenicist and segregationist activism, and The Pioneer Fund supported the work of a number of noted and controversial researchers of race and intelligence, such as the Nobel Laureate William Shockley, the American differential psychologist Arthur Jensen, the Canadian evolutionary psychologist J. Philippe Rushton, and the British anthropologist Roger Pearson. Though he never served as the Pioneer Fund's president, Draper remained on its board until his death and left his estate to the Fund. He also donated considerable funds to right-wing political organizations and candidates, including the World Anti-Communist League (WACL), which was later headed by Pearson, who had received extensive funding from The Pioneer Fund and Draper during his career at University of Southern Mississippi.

In addition to the Pioneer Fund, Draper financed the Back to Africa repatriation movement, particularly the work of Earnest Sevier Cox, whose book "White America" he also funded. During the Civil Rights Movement of the 1960s, he secretly sent $255,000 to the Mississippi State Sovereignty Commission in 1963 and 1964 to support racial segregation. He also promoted opposition to the desegregation of public schools mandated by the Supreme Court's 1954 decision, Brown v. Board of Education. Those financial contributions came to light in the 1990s, when the Sovereignty Commission's records were made public. Doug A. Blackmon of The Wall Street Journal and Prof. William H. Tucker of Rutgers University discovered the incriminating documents.

== Funding of Mississippi Sovereignty Commission ==
Draper was one of the primary out-of-state benefactors of the Mississippi State Sovereignty Commission (MSC), during 1963 and 1964. MSC attorney John Satterfield identified Draper's contributions, totaling over $250,000 as originating from "The Wall Street Gang" from the North. Doug Blackmon of The Wall Street Journal uncovered evidence of these contributions via Draper's J. P. Morgan trust account and published his results on June 11, 1999, in The Wall Street Journal.

== Later life ==
Considered reclusive, Draper maintained a low profile throughout his life, as did the Pioneer Fund. When Draper died in 1972 from prostate cancer, he bequeathed $1.4 million to the Pioneer Fund.

Draper's work has become more controversial since the publication of The Bell Curve (1994), because the Pioneer Fund financially sponsored much of the research reported in the book. The publication of The Nazi Connection: Eugenics, American Racism, and German National Socialism (1994) by Stefan Kühl resulted in further publicity for Draper and the Fund.

== Notes ==
2.
