= Nathan Brody =

American psychology professor Emeritus

- Education: University of New Hampshire; University of Michigan
- Known for: Work on intelligence and personality
- Scientific career
- Fields: Psychology
- Workplaces: Wesleyan University
- Thesis: Demand for certainty, motivation, and the decision process (1961)

Nathan Brody is an American psychology professor Emeritus known for his work on intelligence and personality.

Brody completed a BA at the University of New Hampshire and an MA and PhD at the University of Michigan. He taught at Wesleyan University and is currently there a professor emeritus.

Brody was part of an 11-member 1995 American Psychological Association task force led by Ulric Neisser which published Intelligence: Knowns and Unknowns, a report written in response to The Bell Curve. He was one of the contributors to the 1998 special issue devoted to Arthur Jensen in Intelligence, where he praised Jensen's work as a "formidable contribution" to the topic of race and intelligence, despite disagreeing about some points.

== Publications ==
- Brody N. Human Motivation: Commentary on Goal-Directed Action. Academic Press (July 1, 1983) ISBN 0-12-134840-7.
- Brody N. Personality: research and theory. Academic Press (1972) ISBN 0-12-134850-4
- Brody N. Personality: In Search of Individuality. Academic Press (March 28, 1988) ISBN 0-12-134845-8.
- Brody N. Intelligence. Academic Press; 2nd edition (March 20, 1992, 1st edition 1976) ISBN 0-12-134251-4.
- Brody N, Ehrlichman H. Personality Psychology: Science of Individuality. Prentice Hall; 1st edition (August 12, 1997) ISBN 0-13-146903-7.
