= Bell curve (disambiguation) =

Bell curve usually refers to the characteristic shape of the normal distribution, which uses the Gaussian function.

Bell curve may also refer to:

- Bell-shaped function, any mathematical function having a bell-shaped curve
- The Bell Curve, a 1994 book by Richard J. Herrnstein and Charles Murray
  - The Bell Curve Debate, a 1995 book on The Bell Curve edited by Jacoby and Glauberman
- Bell curve grading, a method of evaluating scholastic performance
