= Race and intelligence =

Discussions and claims of differences in intelligence along racial lines

Discussions of race and intelligence—specifically regarding claims of differences in intelligence along racial lines—have appeared in both popular science and academic research since the modern concept of race was first introduced. With the inception of IQ testing in the early 20th century, differences in average test performance between racial groups have been observed, though these differences have fluctuated and in many cases steadily decreased over time. Complicating the issue, modern science has concluded that race is a socially constructed phenomenon rather than a biological reality, and there exist various conflicting definitions of intelligence. In particular, the validity of IQ testing as a metric for human intelligence is disputed. Today, the scientific consensus is that genetics does not explain differences in IQ test performance between groups, and that observed differences are environmental in origin.

Pseudoscientific claims of inherent differences in intelligence between races have played a central role in the history of scientific racism. The first tests showing differences in IQ scores between different population groups in the United States were those of United States Army recruits in World War I. In the 1920s, groups of eugenics lobbyists argued that these results demonstrated that African Americans and certain immigrant groups were of inferior intellect to Anglo-Saxon white people, and that this was due to innate biological differences. In turn, they used such beliefs to justify policies of racial segregation. However, other studies soon appeared, contesting these conclusions and arguing that the Army tests had not adequately controlled for environmental factors, such as socioeconomic and educational inequality between the groups.

Later observations of phenomena such as the Flynn effect and disparities in access to prenatal care highlighted ways in which environmental factors affect group IQ differences. In recent decades, as understanding of human genetics has advanced, claims of inherent differences in intelligence between races have been broadly rejected by scientists on both theoretical and empirical grounds.

== History of the controversy ==
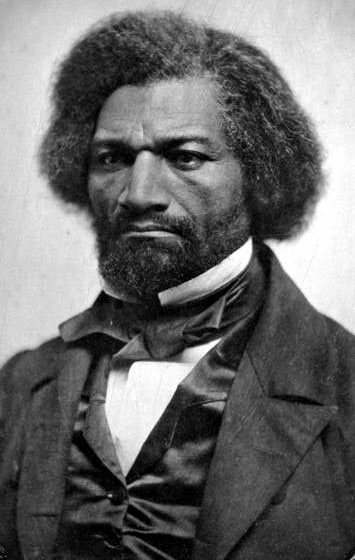
Autodidact and abolitionist Frederick Douglass (1817–1895) served as a high-profile counterexample to myths of black intellectual inferiority.

Claims of differences in intelligence between races have been used to justify colonialism, slavery, racism, social Darwinism, and racial eugenics. During the late 19th and early 20th centuries, claims of intellectual inferiority were used to support views that Asian militaries were inherently weaker than their Western counterparts. Racial thinkers such as Arthur de Gobineau in France relied crucially on the assumption that black people were innately inferior to white people in developing their ideologies of white supremacy. Even Enlightenment thinkers such as Thomas Jefferson, a slave owner, believed black people to be innately inferior to white people in physique and intellect. At the same time in the United States, prominent examples of African-American genius such the autodidact and abolitionist Frederick Douglass, the pioneering sociologist W. E. B. Du Bois, and the poet Paul Laurence Dunbar stood as high-profile counterexamples to widespread stereotypes of black intellectual inferiority. In the Western world, Japan's victory over Russia in the Russo-Japanese War began to reverse negative stereotypes of Asian intellectual inferiority.

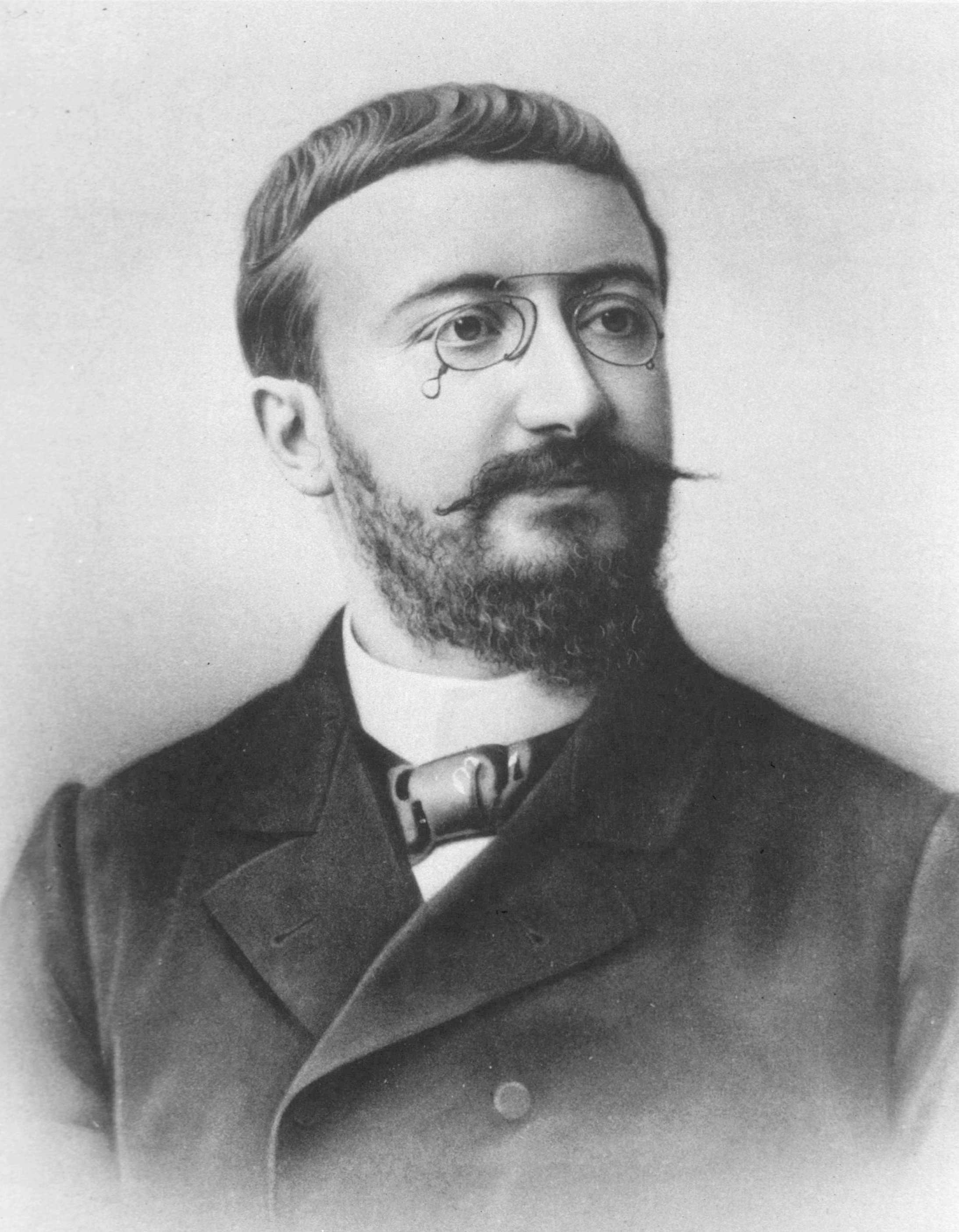
Alfred Binet (1857–1911), inventor of the first intelligence test

=== Early IQ testing ===
The first practical intelligence test, the Binet-Simon Intelligence Test, was developed between 1905 and 1908 by Alfred Binet and Théodore Simon in France for school placement of children. Binet warned that results from his test should not be assumed to measure innate intelligence or used to label individuals permanently. Binet's test was translated into English and revised in 1916 by Lewis Terman (who introduced IQ scoring for the test results) and published under the name Stanford–Binet Intelligence Scales. In 1916 Terman wrote that Mexican-Americans, African-Americans, and Native Americans have a mental "dullness [that] seems to be racial, or at least inherent in the family stocks from which they come."

The US Army used a different set of tests developed by Robert Yerkes to evaluate draftees for World War I. Based on the Army's data, prominent psychologists and eugenicists such as Henry H. Goddard, Harry H. Laughlin, and Princeton professor Carl Brigham wrote that people from southern and eastern Europe were less intelligent than native-born Americans or immigrants from the Nordic countries, and that black Americans were less intelligent than white Americans. The results were widely publicized by a lobby of anti-immigration activists, including the conservationist and theorist of scientific racism Madison Grant, who considered the so-called Nordic race to be superior, but under threat because of immigration by "inferior breeds." In his influential work, A Study of American Intelligence, psychologist Carl Brigham used the results of the Army tests to argue for a stricter immigration policy, limiting immigration to countries considered to belong to the "Nordic race".

In the 1920s, some US states enacted eugenic laws, such as Virginia's 1924 Racial Integrity Act, which established the one-drop rule (of 'racial purity') as law. Many scientists reacted negatively to eugenicist claims linking abilities and moral character to racial or genetic ancestry. They pointed to the contribution of environment (such as speaking English as a second language) to test results. By the mid-1930s, many psychologists in the US had adopted the view that environmental and cultural factors played a dominant role in IQ test results. The psychologist Carl Brigham repudiated his own earlier arguments, explaining that he had come to realize that the tests were not a measure of innate intelligence.

Discussions of the issue in the United States, especially in the writings of Madison Grant, influenced German Nazi claims that the "Nordics" were a "master race". As American public sentiment shifted against the Germans, claims of racial differences in intelligence increasingly came to be regarded as problematic. Anthropologists such as Franz Boas, Ruth Benedict, and Gene Weltfish did much to demonstrate that claims about racial hierarchies of intelligence were unscientific. Nonetheless, a powerful eugenics and segregation lobby funded largely by textile-magnate Wickliffe Draper continued to use intelligence studies as an argument for eugenics, segregation, and anti-immigration legislation.

=== Pioneer Fund and The Bell Curve ===
In 1937, Draper founded the Pioneer Fund with the mission "to advance the scientific study of heredity and human differences". This fund would become a central driver of research into race and intelligence. The Southern Poverty Law Center lists the Pioneer Fund as a hate group, and numerous scholars have criticized it for promoting scientific racism, eugenics and white supremacy.

As the desegregation of the United States gained traction in the 1950s, debate about black intelligence resurfaced. Audrey Shuey, funded by the Pioneer Fund, published a new analysis of Yerkes' tests, concluding that black people really were of inferior intellect to white people. This study was used by segregationists to argue that it was to the advantage of black children to be educated separately from the superior white children. In the 1960s, the debate was revived when William Shockley publicly defended the view that black children were innately unable to learn as well as white children. Arthur Jensen expressed similar opinions in his Harvard Educational Review article, "How Much Can We Boost IQ and Scholastic Achievement?," which questioned the value of compensatory education for African-American children. He suggested that poor educational performance in such cases reflected an underlying genetic cause rather than lack of stimulation at home or other environmental factors.

Another revival of public debate followed the appearance of The Bell Curve (1994), a book by Richard Herrnstein and Charles Murray that supported the general viewpoint of Jensen. Many of the references and sources used in the book were advocates for racial hygiene, whose research was funded by Pioneer Fund and published in its affiliated journal Mankind Quarterly. A statement in support of Herrnstein and Murray titled "Mainstream Science on Intelligence," was published in The Wall Street Journal. The Bell Curve also led to critical responses in a statement titled "Intelligence: Knowns and Unknowns" by the American Psychological Association and in several books, including The Bell Curve Debate (1995), Inequality by Design (1996) and a second edition of The Mismeasure of Man (1996) by Stephen Jay Gould.

Some of the authors proposing genetic explanations for group differences have received funding from the Pioneer Fund, which was headed by J. Philippe Rushton until his death in 2012. Arthur Jensen, who jointly with Rushton published a 2005 review article arguing that the difference in average IQs between blacks and whites is partly due to genetics, received $1.1 million in grants from the Pioneer Fund. According to Ashley Montagu, "The University of California's Arthur Jensen, cited twenty-three times in The Bell Curve's bibliography, is the book's principal authority on the intellectual inferiority of blacks."

Additional books by psychologist Pioneer Fund board member Richard Lynn and political scientist Tatu Vanhanen titled IQ and the Wealth of Nations and IQ and Global Inequality, where they try to find a correlation between national IQ test scores and the size of a country's economy, also fueled the debate, with several researchers criticizing their conclusions. On July 27, 2020, the European Human Behavior and Evolution Association issued a formal statement opposing the utilization of Lynn's national IQ dataset, citing various methodological concerns. They concluded, "Any conclusions drawn from analyses which use these data are therefore unsound, and no reliable evolutionary work should be using these data."

On 24 January 2026, the New York Times reported that a group of fringe researchers with a long history of racist pseudoscience had used deception to access protected NIH data. The group, which included Bryan Pesta, Jordan Lasker, John G. R. Fuerst, and Emil Kirkegaard and was funded in part by the Pioneer Fund, used the data "to produce at least 16 papers purporting to find biological evidence for differences in intelligence between races, ranking ethnicities by I.Q. scores and suggesting Black people earn less because they are not very smart. Mainstream geneticists have rejected their work as biased and unscientific. Yet by relying on genetic and other personal data from the prominent project, known as the Adolescent Brain Cognitive Development Study, the researchers gave their theories an air of analytical rigor.” These papers sparked a new wave of online disinformation about race and intelligence. Pesta, the only one of the group to hold a university position, was fired from Cleveland State University because of this scientific misconduct.

== Conceptual issues ==
=== Intelligence and IQ ===
The concept of intelligence and the degree to which intelligence is measurable are matters of debate. There is no consensus about how to define intelligence; nor is it universally accepted that it is something that can be meaningfully measured by a single figure. A recurring criticism is that different societies value and promote different kinds of skills and that the concept of intelligence is therefore culturally variable and cannot be measured by the same criteria in different societies. Consequently, some critics argue that it makes no sense to propose relationships between intelligence and other variables.

Correlations between scores on various types of IQ tests led English psychologist Charles Spearman to propose in 1904 the existence of an underlying factor, which he referred to as "g" or "general intelligence", a trait which is supposed to be innate. Another proponent of this view is Arthur Jensen. This view, however, has been contradicted by a number of studies showing that education and changes in environment can significantly improve IQ test results.

Other psychometricians have argued that, whether or not there is such a thing as a general intelligence factor, performance on tests relies crucially on knowledge acquired through prior exposure to the types of tasks that such tests contain. This means that comparisons of test scores between persons with widely different life experiences and cognitive habits do not reveal their relative innate potentials.

=== Race ===
The consensus view among geneticists, biologists and anthropologists is that race is a sociopolitical phenomenon rather than a biological one, a view supported by considerable genetics research. Race is a social construct based on folk ideologies that differentiate groups based on social disparities and superficial physical characteristics. A 2023 consensus report from the National Academies of Sciences, Engineering, and Medicine stated: "In humans, race is a socially constructed designation, a misleading and harmful surrogate for population genetic differences, and has a long history of being incorrectly identified as the major genetic reason for phenotypic differences between groups."

The concept of human "races" as natural and separate divisions within the human species has also been rejected by the American Anthropological Association. The official position of the AAA, adopted in 1998, is that advances in scientific knowledge have made it "clear that human populations are not unambiguous, clearly demarcated, biologically distinct groups" and that "any attempt to establish lines of division among biological populations [is] both arbitrary and subjective." A more recent statement from the American Association of Physical Anthropologists (2019) declares that "Race does not provide an accurate representation of human biological variation. It was never accurate in the past, and it remains inaccurate when referencing contemporary human populations. Humans are not divided biologically into distinct continental types or racial genetic clusters."

Anthropologists such as C. Loring Brace, the philosophers Jonathan Kaplan and Rasmus Winther, and the geneticist Joseph Graves, have argued that the cluster structure of genetic data is dependent on the initial hypotheses of the researcher and the influence of these hypotheses on the choice of populations to sample. When one samples continental groups, the clusters become continental, but if one had chosen other sampling patterns, the clustering would be different. Weiss and Fullerton have noted that if one sampled only Icelanders, Mayans and Maoris, three distinct clusters would form and all other populations could be described as being clinally composed of admixtures of Maori, Icelandic and Mayan genetic materials. Kaplan and Winther conclude that while racial groups are characterized by different allele frequencies, this does not mean that racial classification is a natural taxonomy of the human species, because multiple other genetic patterns can be found in human populations that crosscut racial distinctions. Moreover, the genomic data underdetermines whether one wishes to see subdivisions (i.e., splitters) or a continuum (i.e., lumpers). Under Kaplan and Winther's view, racial groupings are objective social constructions (see Mills 1998) that have conventional biological reality only insofar as the categories are chosen and constructed for pragmatic scientific reasons. Sternberg, Grigorenko & Kidd (2005) argue that the social construction of race derives not from any valid scientific basis but rather "from people's desire to classify."

In studies of human intelligence, race is almost always determined using self-reports rather than analyses of genetic characteristics. According to psychologist David Rowe, self-report is the preferred method for racial classification in studies of racial differences because classification based on genetic markers alone ignore the "cultural, behavioral, sociological, psychological, and epidemiological variables" that distinguish racial groups. Hunt and Carlson disagreed, writing that "Nevertheless, self-identification is a surprisingly reliable guide to genetic composition," citing a study by Tang et al. (2005). Sternberg and Grigorenko disputed Hunt and Carlson's interpretation of Tang's results as supporting the view that racial divisions are biological; rather, "Tang et al.'s point was that ancient geographic ancestry rather than current residence is associated with self-identification and not that such self-identification provides evidence for the existence of biological race."

== Group differences ==
The study of human intelligence is one of the most controversial topics in psychology, in part because of difficulty reaching agreement about the meaning of intelligence and objections to the assumption that intelligence can be meaningfully measured by IQ tests. Claims that there are innate differences in intelligence between racial and ethnic groups—which go back at least to the 19th century—have been criticized for relying on specious assumptions and research methods and for serving as an ideological framework for discrimination and racism.

In a 2012 study of tests of different components of intelligence, Hampshire et al. expressed disagreement with the view of Jensen and Rushton that genetic factors must play a role in IQ differences between races, stating that "it remains unclear ... whether population differences in intelligence test scores are driven by heritable factors or by other correlated demographic variables such as socioeconomic status, education level, and motivation. More relevantly, it is questionable whether [population differences in intelligence test scores] relate to a unitary intelligence factor, as opposed to a bias in testing paradigms toward particular components of a more complex intelligence construct." According to Jackson and Weidman,

There are a number of reasons why the genetic argument for race differences in intelligence has not won many adherents in the scientific community. First, even taken on its own terms, the case made by Jensen and his followers did not hold up to scrutiny. Second, the rise of population genetics undercut the claims for a genetic cause of intelligence. Third, the new understanding of institutional racism offered a better explanation for the existence of differences in IQ scores between the races.

=== Test scores ===
In the United States, Asians on average score higher than White people, who tend to score higher than Hispanics, who tend to score higher than African Americans. There is more variation in IQ scores within each racial group, such as when they are divided by income, than between different ethnic groups when compared as a whole against each other. A 2001 meta-analysis of the results of 6,246,729 participants tested for cognitive ability or aptitude found a difference in average scores between black people and white people of 1.1 standard deviations. Consistent results were found for college and university application tests such as the Scholastic Aptitude Test (N = 2.4 million) and Graduate Record Examination (N = 2.3 million), as well as for tests of job applicants in corporate settings (N = 0.5 million) and in the military (N = 0.4 million).

In response to the controversial 1994 book The Bell Curve, the American Psychological Association (APA) formed a task-force of eleven experts, which issued a report "Intelligence: Knowns and Unknowns" in 1996. Regarding group differences, the report reaffirmed the consensus that differences within groups are much wider than differences between groups, and that claims of ethnic differences in intelligence should be scrutinized carefully, as such claims had been used to justify racial discrimination. The report also acknowledged problems with the racial categories used, as these categories are neither consistently applied, nor homogeneous.

In the UK, some African groups have higher average educational attainment and standardized test scores than the overall population. In 2010–2011, white British pupils were 2.3% less likely to have gained 5 A*–C grades at GCSE than the national average, whereas the likelihood was 21.8% above average for those of Nigerian origin, 5.5% above average for those of Ghanaian origin, and 1.4% above average for those of Sierra Leonian origin. For the two other African ethnic groups on which data was available, the likelihood was 23.7% below average for those of Somali origin and 35.3% below average for those of Congolese origin. In 2014, Black-African pupils of 11 language groups were more likely to pass Key Stage 2 Maths 4+ in England than the national average. Overall, the average pass rate by ethnicity was 86.5% for white British (N = 395,787), whereas it was 85.6% for Black-Africans (N = 18,497). Nevertheless, several Black-African language groups, including Yoruba, Igbo, Hausa, Akan, Ga, Swahili, Edo, Ewe, Amharic speakers, and English-speaking Africans, each had an average pass rate above the white British average (total N = 9,314), with the Hausa, Igbo, Yoruba, and Amhara having averages above 90% (N = 2,071). In 2017–2018, the percentage of pupils getting a strong pass (grade 5 or above) in the English and maths GCSE (in Key Stage 4) was 42.7% for whites (N = 396,680) and 44.3% for Black-Africans (N = 18,358).

=== Flynn effect and the closing gap ===
The 'Flynn effect' — a term coined after researcher James R. Flynn — refers to the substantial rise in raw IQ test scores observed in many parts of the world during the 20th century. In the United States, the increase was continuous and approximately linear from the earliest years of testing to about 1998 when the gains stopped and some tests even showed decreasing test scores. For example, the average scores of black people on some IQ tests in 1995 were the same as the scores of white people in 1945. As one pair of academics phrased it, "the typical African American today probably has a slightly higher IQ than the grandparents of today's average white American."

Flynn himself argued that the dramatic changes having taken place between one just generation and the next pointed strongly at an environmental explanation, and that it is highly unlikely that genetic factors could have accounted for the increasing scores. The Flynn effect, along with Flynn's analysis, continues to hold significance in the context of the black/white IQ gap debate, demonstrating the potential for environmental factors to influence IQ test scores by as much as 1 standard deviation, a scale of change that had previously been doubted.

A distinct but related observation has been the gradual narrowing of the American black-white IQ gap in the last decades of the 20th century, as black test-takers increased their average scores relative to white test-takers. For instance, Vincent reported in 1991 that the black–white IQ gap was decreasing among children, but that it was remaining constant among adults. Similarly, a 2006 study by Dickens and Flynn estimated that the difference between mean scores of black people and white people closed by about 5 or 6 IQ points between 1972 and 2002, a reduction of about one-third. In the same period, the educational achievement disparity also diminished. Reviews by Flynn and Dickens, Mackintosh, and Nisbett et al. accept the gradual closing of the gap as a fact. Flynn and Dickens summarize this trend, stating, "The constancy of the Black-White IQ gap is a myth and therefore cannot be cited as evidence that the racial IQ gap is genetic in origin."

== Environmental factors ==
=== Health and nutrition ===
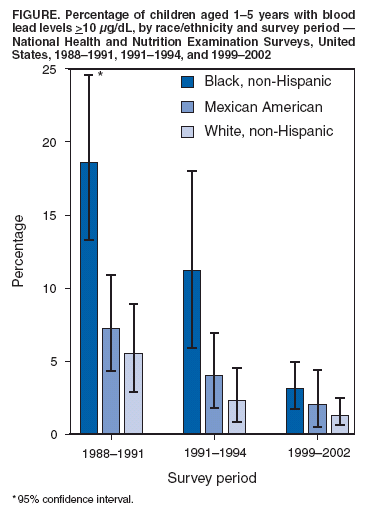
Percentage of children aged 1–5 with blood lead levels at least 10 μg/dL. Black and Hispanic children have much higher levels than white children. A 10 μg/dL increase in blood lead at 24 months is associated with a 5.8-point decline in IQ. Although the Geometric Mean Blood Lead Levels (GM BLL) are declining, a CDC report (2002) states that: "However, the GM BLL for non-Hispanic black children remains higher than that for Mexican-American and non-Hispanic white children, indicating that differences in risk for exposure still persist."

Environmental factors including childhood lead exposure, low rates of breast feeding, and poor nutrition are significantly correlated with poor cognitive development and functioning. For example, childhood exposure to lead — associated with homes in poorer areas — correlates with an average IQ drop of 7 points, and iodine deficiency causes a decline, on average, of 12 IQ points. Such impairments may sometimes be permanent, but in some cases they be partially or wholly compensated for by later growth.

The first two years of life are critical for malnutrition, the consequences of which are often irreversible and include poor cognitive development, educability, and future economic productivity. Mackintosh points out that, for American black people, infant mortality is about twice as high as for white people, and low birth weight is twice as prevalent. At the same time, white mothers are twice as likely to breastfeed their infants, and breastfeeding is directly correlated with IQ for low-birth-weight infants. In this way, a wide number of health-related factors which influence IQ are unequally distributed between the two groups.

The Copenhagen consensus in 2004 stated that lack of both iodine and iron has been implicated in impaired brain development, and this can affect enormous numbers of people: it is estimated that one-third of the total global population is affected by iodine deficiency. In developing countries, it is estimated that 40% of children aged four and under have anaemia because of insufficient iron in their diets.

Other scholars have found that simply the standard of nutrition has a significant effect on population intelligence, and that the Flynn effect may be caused by increasing nutrition standards across the world. James Flynn has himself argued against this view.

Some recent research has argued that the retardation caused in brain development by infectious diseases, many of which are more prevalent in non-white populations, may be an important factor in explaining the differences in IQ between different regions of the world. The findings of this research, showing the correlation between IQ, race and infectious diseases was also shown to apply to the IQ gap in the US, suggesting that this may be an important environmental factor.

A 2013 meta-analysis by the World Health Organization found that, after controlling for maternal IQ, breastfeeding was associated with IQ gains of 2.19 points. The authors suggest that this relationship is causal but state that the practical significance of this gain is debatable; however, they highlight one study suggesting an association between breastfeeding and academic performance in Brazil, where "breastfeeding duration does not present marked variability by socioeconomic position." Colen and Ramey (2014) similarly find that controlling for sibling comparisons within families, rather than between families, reduces the correlation between breastfeeding status and WISC IQ scores by nearly a third, but further find the relationship between breastfeeding duration and WISC IQ scores to be insignificant. They suggest that "much of the beneficial long-term effects typically attributed to breastfeeding, per se, may primarily be due to selection pressures into infant feeding practices along key demographic characteristics such as race and socioeconomic status." Reichman estimates that no more than 3 to 4% of the black–white IQ gap can be explained by black–white disparities in low birth weight.

=== Education ===
Several studies have proposed that a large part of the gap in IQ test performance can be attributed to differences in quality of education. Racial discrimination in education has been proposed as one possible cause of differences in educational quality between races. According to a paper by Hala Elhoweris, Kagendo Mutua, Negmeldin Alsheikh and Pauline Holloway, teachers' referral decisions for students to participate in gifted and talented educational programs were influenced in part by the students' ethnicity.

The Abecedarian Early Intervention Project, an intensive early childhood education project, was also able to bring about an average IQ gain of 4.4 points at age 21 in the black children who participated in it compared to controls. Arthur Jensen agreed that the Abecedarian project demonstrated that education can have a significant effect on IQ, but also declared his view that no educational program thus far had been able to reduce the black–white IQ gap by more than a third, and that differences in education are thus unlikely to be its only cause.

A series of studies by Joseph Fagan and Cynthia Holland measured the effect of prior exposure to the kind of cognitive tasks posed in IQ tests on test performance. Assuming that the IQ gap was the result of lower exposure to tasks using the cognitive functions usually found in IQ tests among African American test takers, they prepared a group of African Americans in this type of tasks before taking an IQ test. The researchers found that there was no subsequent difference in performance between the African-Americans and white test takers. Daley and Onwuegbuzie conclude that Fagan and Holland demonstrate that "differences in knowledge between black people and white people for intelligence test items can be erased when equal opportunity is provided for exposure to the information to be tested". A similar argument is made by David Marks who argues that IQ differences correlate well with differences in literacy suggesting that developing literacy skills through education causes an increase in IQ test performance.

A 2003 study found that two variables—stereotype threat and the degree of educational attainment of children's fathers—partially explained the black–white gap in cognitive ability test scores, undermining the hereditarian view that they stemmed from immutable genetic factors.

=== Socioeconomic environment ===
Different aspects of the socioeconomic environment in which children are raised have been shown to correlate with part of the IQ gap, but they do not account for the entire gap. According to a 2006 review, these factors account for slightly less than half of one standard deviation.

Other research has focused on different causes of variation within low socioeconomic status (SES) and high SES groups. In the US, among low SES groups, genetic differences account for a smaller proportion of the variance in IQ than among high SES populations. Such effects are predicted by the bioecological hypothesis—that genotypes are transformed into phenotypes through nonadditive synergistic effects of the environment. Nisbett et al. (2012a) suggest that high SES individuals are more likely to be able to develop their full biological potential, whereas low SES individuals are likely to be hindered in their development by adverse environmental conditions. The same review also points out that adoption studies generally are biased towards including only high and high middle SES adoptive families, meaning that they will tend to overestimate average genetic effects. They also note that studies of adoption from lower-class homes to middle-class homes have shown that such children experience a 12 to 18 point gain in IQ relative to children who remain in low SES homes. A 2015 study found that environmental factors (namely, family income, maternal education, maternal verbal ability/knowledge, learning materials in the home, parenting factors, child birth order, and child birth weight) accounted for the black–white gap in cognitive ability test scores.

=== Test bias ===
A number of studies have reached the conclusion that IQ tests may be biased against certain groups. The validity and reliability of IQ scores obtained from outside the United States and Europe have been questioned, in part because of the inherent difficulty of comparing IQ scores between cultures. Several researchers have argued that cultural differences limit the appropriateness of standard IQ tests in non-industrialized communities.

A 1996 report by the American Psychological Association states that intelligence can be difficult to compare across cultures, and notes that differing familiarity with test materials can produce substantial differences in test results; it also says that tests are accurate predictors of future achievement for black and white Americans, and are in that sense unbiased. The view that tests accurately predict future educational attainment is reinforced by Nicholas Mackintosh in his 1998 book IQ and Human Intelligence, and by a 1999 literature review by Brown, Reynolds & Whitaker (1999).

James R. Flynn, surveying studies on the topic, notes that the weight and presence of many test questions depends on what sorts of information and modes of thinking are culturally valued.

=== Stereotype threat and minority status ===
Stereotype threat is the fear that one's behavior will confirm an existing stereotype of a group with which one identifies or by which one is defined; this fear may in turn lead to an impairment of performance. Testing situations that highlight the fact that intelligence is being measured tend to lower the scores of individuals from racial-ethnic groups who already score lower on average or are expected to score lower. Stereotype threat conditions cause larger than expected IQ differences among groups. Psychometrician Nicholas Mackintosh considers that there is little doubt that the effects of stereotype threat contribute to the IQ gap between black people and white people.

A large number of studies have shown that systemically disadvantaged minorities, such as the African American minority of the United States, generally perform worse in the educational system and in intelligence tests than the majority groups or less disadvantaged minorities such as immigrant or "voluntary" minorities. The explanation of these findings may be that children of caste-like minorities, due to the systemic limitations of their prospects of social advancement, do not have "effort optimism", i.e. they do not have the confidence that acquiring the skills valued by majority society, such as those skills measured by IQ tests, is worthwhile. They may even deliberately reject certain behaviors that are seen as "acting white." Research published in 1997 indicates that part of the black–white gap in cognitive ability test scores is due to racial differences in test motivation.

Some researchers have suggested that stereotype threat should not be interpreted as a factor in real-life performance gaps, and have raised the possibility of publication bias. Other critics have focused on correcting what they claim are misconceptions of early studies showing a large effect. However, numerous meta-analyses and systematic reviews have shown significant evidence for the effects of stereotype threat, though the phenomenon defies over-simplistic characterization. For instance, one meta-analysis found that with female subjects "subtle threat-activating cues produced the largest effect, followed by blatant and moderately explicit cues" while with minorities "moderately explicit stereotype threat-activating cues produced the largest effect, followed by blatant and subtle cues".

Some researchers have argued that studies of stereotype threat may in fact systematically under-represent its effects, since such studies measure "only that portion of psychological threat that research has identified and remedied. To the extent that unidentified or unremedied psychological threats further undermine performance, the results underestimate the bias."

== Research into possible genetic factors ==
Although IQ differences between individuals have been shown to have a large hereditary component, it does not follow that mean group-level disparities (between-group differences) in IQ necessarily have a genetic basis. Today, the scientific consensus is that genetics does not explain differences in IQ test performance between groups. Growing evidence indicates that environmental factors, not genetic ones, explain the racial IQ gap.

=== Genetics of race and intelligence ===
Geneticist Alan R. Templeton argued that the question about the possible genetic effects on the test score gap is muddled by the general focus on "race" rather than on populations defined by gene frequency or by geographical proximity, and by the general insistence on phrasing the question in terms of heritability. Templeton pointed out that racial groups neither represent sub-species nor distinct evolutionary lineages, and that therefore there is no basis for making claims about the general intelligence of races. He argued that, for these reasons, the search for possible genetic influences on the black–white test score gap is a priori flawed, because there is no genetic material shared by all Africans or by all Europeans. Mackintosh (2011), on the other hand, argued that by using genetic cluster analysis to correlate gene frequencies with continental populations it might be possible to show that African populations have a higher frequency of certain genetic variants that contribute to differences in average intelligence. Such a hypothetical situation could hold without all Africans carrying the same genes or belonging to a single evolutionary lineage. According to Mackintosh, a biological basis for the observed gap in IQ test performance thus cannot be ruled out on a priori grounds.

Hunt (2010, p. 447) noted that "no genes related to difference in cognitive skills across the various racial and ethnic groups have ever been discovered. The argument for genetic differences has been carried forward largely by circumstantial evidence. Of course, tomorrow afternoon genetic mechanisms producing racial and ethnic differences in intelligence might be discovered, but there have been a lot of investigations, and tomorrow has not come for quite some time now." Mackintosh (2011, p. 344) concurred, noting that while several environmental factors have been shown to influence the IQ gap, the evidence for a genetic influence has been negligible. A 2012 review by Nisbett et al. (2012a) concluded that the entire IQ gap can be explained by known environmental factors, and Mackintosh found this view to be plausible.

More recent research attempting to identify genetic loci associated with individual-level differences in IQ has yielded promising results, which led the editorial board of Nature to issue a statement differentiating this research from the "racist" pseudoscience which it acknowledged has dogged intelligence research since its inception. It characterized the idea of genetically determined differences in intelligence between races as definitively false. Analysis of polygenic scores sampled from the 1000 Genomes Project has likewise found no evidence that intelligence was under diversifying selection in Africans and Europeans, suggesting that genetic differences cannot be a significant factor in the observed Black-White gap in average IQ test performance.

=== Heritability within and between groups ===
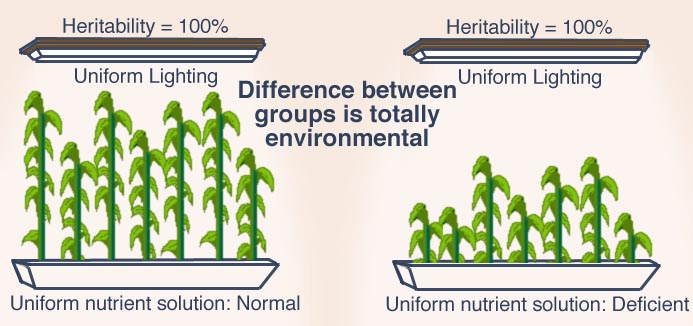
An environmental factor that varies between groups but not within groups can cause group differences in a trait that is otherwise 100 percent heritable.

Twin studies of intelligence have reported high heritability values. However, these studies have been criticized for being based on questionable assumptions. When used in the context of human behavior genetics, the term "heritability" can be misleading, as it does not necessarily convey information about the relative importance of genetic or environmental factors on the development of a given trait, nor does it convey the extent to which that trait is genetically determined. Arguments in support of a genetic explanation of racial differences in IQ are sometimes fallacious. For instance, hereditarians have sometimes cited the failure of known environmental factors to account for such differences, or the high heritability of intelligence within races, as evidence that racial differences in IQ are genetic.

Psychometricians have found that intelligence is substantially heritable within populations, with 30–50% of variance in IQ scores in early childhood being attributable to genetic factors in analyzed US populations, increasing to 75–80% by late adolescence. In biology heritability is defined as the ratio of variation attributable to genetic differences in an observable trait to the trait's total observable variation. The heritability of a trait describes the proportion of variation in the trait that is attributable to genetic factors within a particular population. A heritability of 1 indicates that variation correlates fully with genetic variation and a heritability of 0 indicates that there is no correlation between the trait and genes at all. In psychological testing, heritability tends to be understood as the degree of correlation between the results of a test taker and those of their biological parents. However, since high heritability is simply a correlation between child and parents, it does not describe the causes of heritability which in humans can be either genetic or environmental.

Therefore, a high heritability measure does not imply that a trait is genetic or unchangeable. In addition, environmental factors that affect all group members equally will not be measured by heritability, and the heritability of a trait may also change over time in response to changes in the distribution of genetic and environmental factors. High heritability does not imply that all of the heritability is genetically determined; rather, it can also be due to environmental differences that affect only a certain genetically defined group (indirect heritability).

The figure to the right demonstrates how heritability works. In each of the two gardens the difference between tall and short cornstalks is 100% heritable, as cornstalks that are genetically disposed for growing tall will become taller than those without this disposition. But the difference in height between the cornstalks to the left and those on the right is 100% environmental, as it is due to different nutrients being supplied to the two gardens. Hence, the causes of differences within a group and between groups may not be the same, even when looking at traits that are highly heritable.

=== Spearman's hypothesis ===
Spearman's hypothesis states that the magnitude of the black–white difference in tests of cognitive ability depends entirely or mainly on the extent to which a test measures general mental ability, or g. The hypothesis was first formalized by Arthur Jensen, who devised the statistical "method of correlated vectors" to test it. If Spearman's hypothesis holds true, then the cognitive tasks that have the highest g-load are the tasks in which the gap between black and white test takers are greatest. Jensen and Rushton took this to show that the cause of g and the cause of the gap are the same—in their view, genetic differences.

Mackintosh (2011, pp. 338–39) acknowledges that Jensen and Rushton showed a modest correlation between g-loading, heritability, and the test score gap, but does not agree that this demonstrates a genetic origin of the gap. Mackintosh argues that it is exactly those tests that Rushton and Jensen consider to have the highest g-loading and heritability, such as the Wechsler test, that have seen the greatest increases in black performance due to the Flynn effect. This likely suggests that they are also the most sensitive to environmental changes, which undermines Jensen's argument that the black–white gap is most likely caused by genetic factors. Nisbett et al. (2012a, p. 146) make the same point, noting also that the increase in the IQ scores of black test takers necessarily indicates an increase in g.

James Flynn argued that his findings undermine Spearman's hypothesis. In a 2006 study, he and William Dickens found that between 1972 and 2002 "The standard measure of the g gap between Blacks and Whites declined virtually in tandem with the IQ gap." Flynn also criticized Jensen's basic assumption that a correlation between g-loading and test score gap implies a genetic cause for the gap. In a 2014 suite of meta-analyses, along with co-authors Jan te Nijenhuis and Daniel Metzen, he showed that the same negative correlation between IQ gains and g-loading obtains for cognitive deficits of known environmental cause: iodine deficiency, prenatal cocaine exposure, fetal alcohol syndrome, and traumatic brain injury.

=== Adoption studies ===
A number of IQ studies have been done on the effect of similar rearing conditions on children from different races. The hypothesis is that this can be determined by investigating whether black children adopted into white families demonstrated gains in IQ test scores relative to black children reared in black families. Depending on whether their test scores are more similar to their biological or adoptive families, that could be interpreted as supporting either a genetic or an environmental hypothesis. Critiques of such studies question whether the environment of black children—even when raised in white families—is truly comparable to the environment of white children. Several reviews of the adoption study literature have suggested that it is probably impossible to avoid confounding biological and environmental factors in this type of study. Another criticism by Nisbett et al. (2012a, pp. 134) is that adoption studies on the whole tend to be carried out in a restricted set of environments, mostly in the medium-high SES range, where heritability is higher than in the low-SES range.

The Minnesota Transracial Adoption Study (1976) examined the IQ test scores of 122 adopted children and 143 nonadopted children reared by advantaged white families. The children were restudied ten years later. The study found higher IQ for white people compared to black people, both at age 7 and age 17. Acknowledging the existence of confounding factors, Scarr and Weinberg, the authors of the original study, did not consider that it provided support for either the hereditarian or environmentalist view.

Three other studies lend support to environmental explanations of group IQ differences:

- Eyferth (1961) studied the out-of-wedlock children of black and white soldiers stationed in Germany after World War II who were then raised by white German mothers in what has become known as the Eyferth study. He found no significant differences in average IQ between groups.
- Tizard et al. (1972) studied black (West Indian), white, and mixed-race children raised in British long-stay residential nurseries. Two out of three tests found no significant differences. One test found higher scores for non-white people.
- Moore (1986) compared black and mixed-race children adopted by either black or white middle-class families in the United States. Moore observed that 23 black and interracial children raised by white parents had a significantly higher mean score than 23 age-matched children raised by black parents (117 vs 104), and argued that differences in early socialization explained these differences.

Frydman and Lynn (1989) showed a mean IQ of 119 for Korean infants adopted by Belgian families. After correcting for the Flynn effect, the IQ of the adopted Korean children was still 10 points higher than that of the Belgian children.

Reviewing the evidence from adoption studies, Mackintosh finds that environmental and genetic variables remain confounded and considers evidence from adoption studies inconclusive, and fully compatible with a 100% environmental explanation. Similarly, Drew Thomas argues that race differences in IQ that appear in adoption studies are in fact an artifact of methodology, and that East Asian IQ advantages and black IQ disadvantages disappear when this is controlled for.

=== Racial admixture studies ===
Most people have ancestry from different geographical regions. In particular, African Americans typically have ancestors from both Africa and Europe, with, on average, 20% of their genome inherited from European ancestors. If racial IQ gaps have a partially genetic basis, one might expect black people with a higher degree of European ancestry to score higher on IQ tests than black people with less European ancestry, because the genes inherited from European ancestors would likely include some genes with a positive effect on IQ. Geneticist Alan Templeton has argued that an experiment based on the Mendelian "common garden" design, where specimens with different hybrid compositions are subjected to the same environmental influences, are the only way to definitively show a causal relation between genes and group differences in IQ. Summarizing the findings of admixture studies, he concludes that they have shown no significant correlation between any cognitive ability and the degree of African or European ancestry.

Studies have employed different ways of measuring or approximating relative degrees of ancestry from Africa and Europe. Some studies have used skin color as a measure, and others have used blood groups. Loehlin (2000) surveys the literature and argues that the blood groups studies may be seen as providing some support to the genetic hypothesis, even though the correlation between ancestry and IQ was quite low. He finds that studies by Eyferth (1961), Willerman, Naylor & Myrianthopoulos (1970) did not find a correlation between degree of African/European ancestry and IQ. The latter study did find a difference based on the race of the mother, with children of white mothers with black fathers scoring higher than children of black mothers and white fathers. Loehlin considers that such a finding is compatible with either a genetic or an environmental cause. All in all Loehlin finds admixture studies inconclusive and recommends more research.

Reviewing the evidence from admixture studies Hunt (2010) considers it to be inconclusive because of too many uncontrolled variables. Mackintosh (2011, p. 338) quotes a statement by Nisbett (2009) to the effect that admixture studies have not provided a shred of evidence in favor of a genetic basis for the IQ gap.

=== Mental chronometry ===
Mental chronometry measures the elapsed time between the presentation of a sensory stimulus and the subsequent behavioral response by the participant. These studies have shown inconsistent results when comparing black and white populations groups, with some studies showing whites outperforming blacks, and others showing blacks outperforming whites.

Arthur Jensen argued that this reaction time (RT) is a measure of the speed and efficiency with which the brain processes information, and that scores on most types of RT tasks tend to correlate with scores on standard IQ tests as well as with g. Nisbett argues that some studies have found correlations closer to 0.2, and that a correlation is not always found. Nisbett points to the Jensen & Whang (1993) study in which a group of Chinese Americans had longer reaction times than a group of European Americans, despite having higher IQs. Nisbett also mentions findings in Flynn (1991) and Deary (2001) suggesting that movement time (the measure of how long it takes a person to move a finger after making the decision to do so) correlates with IQ just as strongly as reaction time, and that average movement time is faster for black people than for white people. Mackintosh (2011, p. 339) considers reaction time evidence unconvincing and comments that other cognitive tests that also correlate well with IQ show no disparity at all, for example the habituation/dishabituation test. He further comments that studies show that rhesus monkeys have shorter reaction times than American college students, suggesting that different reaction times may not tell us anything useful about intelligence.

=== Brain size ===
A number of studies have reported a moderate statistical correlation between differences in IQ and brain size between individuals in the same group. Some scholars have reported differences in average brain sizes between racial groups, although this is unlikely to be a good measure of IQ as brain size also differs between men and women, but without significant differences in IQ. At the same time newborn black children have the same average brain size as white children, suggesting that the difference in average size could be accounted for by differences in environment. Several environmental factors that reduce brain size have been demonstrated to disproportionately affect black children.

=== Archaeological data ===
Archaeological evidence does not support claims by Rushton and others that black people's cognitive ability was inferior to white people's during prehistoric times.

== Policy relevance and ethics ==
The ethics of research on race and intelligence has long been a subject of debate: in a 1996 report of the American Psychological Association; in guidelines proposed by Gray and Thompson and by Hunt and Carlson; and in two editorials in Nature in 2009 by Steven Rose and by Stephen J. Ceci and Wendy M. Williams.

Steven Rose maintains that the history of eugenics makes this field of research difficult to reconcile with current ethical standards for science. On the other hand, James R. Flynn has argued that had there been a ban on research on possibly poorly conceived ideas, much valuable research on intelligence testing (including his own discovery of the Flynn effect) would not have occurred.

Many have argued for increased interventions in order to close the gaps. Flynn writes that "America will have to address all the aspects of black experience that are disadvantageous, beginning with the regeneration of inner city neighborhoods and their schools." Especially in developing nations, society has been urged to take on the prevention of cognitive impairment in children as a high priority. Possible preventable causes include malnutrition, infectious diseases such as meningitis, parasites, cerebral malaria, in utero drug and alcohol exposure, newborn asphyxia, low birth weight, head injuries, lead poisoning and endocrine disorders.

== See also ==
- Behavioral epigenetics
- Melanin theory
- Model minority
- Nations and IQ
- Outline of human intelligence
