= Susana Urbina =

American psychologist (1946–2026)

- Born: January 20, 1946; Lima, Peru
- Died: October 30, 2026 (aged 80); Jacksonville, Florida, U.S.
- Education: Fordham University (Ph.D., 1972)
- Known for: Psychological testing and assessment
- Notable work: Essentials of Psychological Testing
- Scientific career
- Fields: Psychology
- Workplaces: University of North Florida

Susana Patricia Urbina (January 20, 1946 – October 30, 2026) was a Peruvian-American psychologist. She received her Ph.D. in Psychometrics from Fordham University in 1972 and was licensed in Florida in 1976. She recently taught at University of North Florida, where her principal areas of teaching and research were psychological testing and assessment.

Urbina was a fellow of Division 5 (Evaluation, Measurement, and Statistics) of the American Psychological Association (APA) and of the Society for Personality Assessment. She chaired the Committee on Psychological Tests and Assessment and the Committee on Professional Practice and Standards of the APA. In 1995, Urbina was part of an 11-member APA task force led by Ulric Neisser which published "Intelligence: Knowns and Unknowns," a report written in response to The Bell Curve.

Urbina died on October 30, 2026, at the age of 80.

== Publications ==
- Urbina S. Psychological Testing: Seventh Edition, Study Guide. Macmillan Pub Co; 6th edition (June 1, 1989) ISBN 0-02-303040-2
- Urbina S. Psychological Testing: Study Guide. Prentice Hall; 7th edition (September 1, 1997) ISBN 0-13-257321-0
- Urbina, Susana (2004). Essentials of Psychological Testing. John Wiley & Sons. ISBN 978-0-471-41978-5.
- Urbina S. (2014) Essentials of Psychological Testing. Wiley; 2nd edition ISBN 978-1-118-68048-3
