= Gwyneth Boodoo =

American psychologist

Gwyneth M. Boodoo (born Trinidad) is an American psychologist and expert on educational measurement.

Boodoo received her doctorate in educational measurement from the University of Toronto in 1978. She has taught at Texas A&M University, where she was an associate professor in the department of educational psychology.

She has worked for Educational Testing Service, where she directed a research program on Equity in Assessment from 1990 to 1992 and wrote the "Fairness" chapter of the 2000 revised version of the ETS Standards for Quality and Fairness.

Boodoo has served on the Board of Scientific Affairs for the American Psychological Association (APA). She currently runs educational consultancy GMB Enterprises in Hamilton Township, Mercer County, New Jersey. She has also sat on several working groups for the Joint Committee on Testing Practices, a coalition established in 1985 by the American Educational Research Association (AERA), the American Psychological Association (APA), and the National Council on Measurement in Education (NCME).

In 1995, Boodoo was part of an 11-member APA task force led by Ulric Neisser which published "Intelligence: Knowns and Unknowns," a report written in response to The Bell Curve.
