= Kim Voss =

American historian (born 1952)

- Born: 1952 (age 73–74)

Academic background
- Education: Catawba College; Cornell University; Stanford University
- Alma mater: Stanford University

Academic work
- Discipline: Sociologist
- Institutions: University of California, Berkeley
- Notable works: Inequality by Design

Kim Voss (born 1952) is a professor of sociology at the University of California, Berkeley. Her main topics of research include social movements, the American labor movement, inequality, and higher education.

== Published works ==
=== Solely authored books ===
- The Making of American Exceptionalism: The Knights of Labor and Class Formation in the Nineteenth Century. Ithaca, N.Y.: Cornell University Press, 1993.

=== Co-authored books ===
- Fischer, Claude; Hout, Michael; Jankowski, Martin Sanchez; Lucas, Samuel R.; Swidler, Ann; and Voss, Kim. Inequality by Design: Cracking the Bell Curve Myth. Princeton, N.J.: Princeton University Press, 1996. ISBN 0-691-02899-0
- Voss, Kim and Fantasia, Rick. Hard Work: Remaking the American Labor Movement. Berkeley: University of California Press, 2004. ISBN 0-520-24013-8

=== Co-edited books ===
- Milkman, Ruth and Kim Voss, eds. Rebuilding Labor: Organizing and Organizers in the New Union Movement. Ithaca, N.Y.: Cornell University Press, 2004. ISBN 0-8014-4265-6
