= Robert Perloff =

American psychologist

- Born: February 3, 1921; Philadelphia, Pennsylvania, U.S.
- Died: April 15, 2013 (aged 92); Oakland, Pittsburgh, Pennsylvania, U.S.
- Education: Temple University (BA); Ohio State University (PhD)
- Known for: former president of the APA, the article "Self-Interest and Personal Responsibility Redux"
- Scientific career
- Fields: Psychology, Business administration
- Workplaces: Purdue University, University of Pittsburgh

Robert Perloff (February 3, 1921 – April 15, 2013) was an American psychology and business administration professor emeritus, who taught at Purdue University and the University of Pittsburgh. He was a president of the Association for Consumer Research and the American Psychological Association.

== Life and work ==
Born and raised in Philadelphia, Perloff was drafted into the United States Army and fought in the Philippines during World War II. Upon his return, Perloff graduated from Temple University in 1949, and his Ph.D. in psychology from Ohio State University. Following postdoctoral work, he taught industrial and consumer psychology at Purdue University. Much of his career was spent as professor of Business and Psychology at University of Pittsburgh.

He was president of the Association for Consumer Research and the American Psychological Association (APA). In his 1985 APA presidential address, "Self-Interest and Personal Responsibility Redux", he praised self-interest. It was printed in American Psychologist (vol. 42, 1987) and the journal called it "one of 50 classic articles published in the journal's previous 50 years."

In 1995, Perloff and 51 others signed "Mainstream Science on Intelligence", a statement written by Linda Gottfredson and published in the Wall Street Journal, which addressed the controversy about intelligence research that followed the publication of the 1994 book The Bell Curve. Also in 1995, Perloff was named to an American Psychological Association task force that reviewed controversial issues in response to the claims made during the Bell Curve controversy, producing a report titled "Intelligence: Knowns and Unknowns."

At the APA's 2001 Annual Convention, Dr. Perloff condemned what he considered the APA's one-sided political activism. "The APA is too politically correct...and too obeisant to special interests" He referred the removal of homosexuality from DSM-III by APA as the willingness of many psychologists to trample patients rights to treatment in the interest of political correctness and added that making such choice unethical would deprive a patient of a treatment of choice because the threat of sanctions would eliminate any psychologist who engaged in such treatment.

In 2004, Perloff was the keynote speaker at the National Association for Research & Therapy of Homosexuality's Annual Conference. In support of the mission statement of NARTH, he concluded, "The individual's right for self-determination of sexuality -- or sexual autonomy -- is, I am happy to see, inherent in NARTH's position statement: 'NARTH respects each client's dignity, autonomy, and free agency...every individual has the right to claim a gay identity, or to develop their heterosexual potential. The right to seek therapy to change one's sexual adaptation is considered self-evident and inalienable.' I subscribe fully to the aforementioned NARTH position statement." Perloff was the 2008 recipient of NARTH's President's Award.

Perloff died of heart failure on April 15, 2013, at UPMC Magee Women's Hospital.

== Selected publications ==
- Datta L-E, Perloff R. Improving Evaluations. 1979: SAGE Focus Editions. ISBN 0-8039-1240-4.
