= Michael Hout =

American sociologist (born 1950)

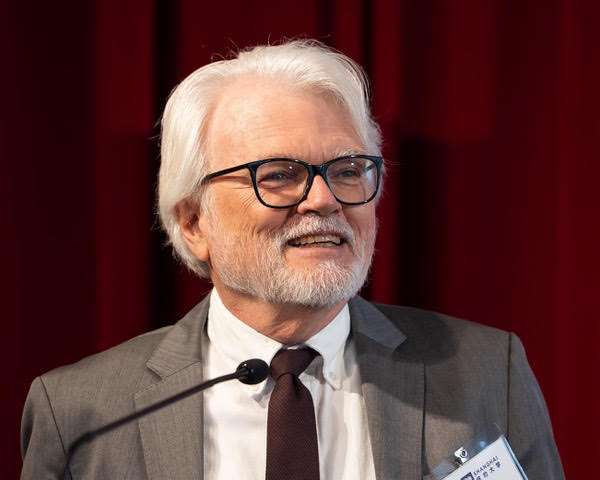
- Born: May 14, 1950 (age 76)
- Awards: Robert M. Hauser Distinguished Scholar Award (2018); Otis Dudley Duncan Award (2007); Clifford Clogg Memorial Award (1996)

Academic background
- Education: University of Pittsburgh (BA, 1972); Indiana University Bloomington (MA, 1973; PhD, 1976)
- Doctoral advisor: Phillips Cutright

Academic work
- Discipline: Sociology
- Institutions: University of Arizona; University of California, Berkeley; New York University
- Doctoral students: Richard Arum; S. Philip Morgan

Michael Hout (born May 14, 1950) is a professor of sociology at New York University. He previously served as a professor at the University of Arizona and University of California, Berkeley.

Hout has studied social inequality, religion, and politics using demographic methods. Much of his research concerns social mobility, with demographic analyses focused on revealing the social facts that block opportunity and create unfairness, while controlling the effects of confounding variables. His other work has examined changing occupational hierarchies and long-term trends associated with political polarization. He measured the decisive effect of education on social mobility and explored the persistent and evolving role of social class. His influential study of Ireland quantified the effects of factors including class, education, religion, and geography, and complicated the idea that industrialization is accompanied by reduction in inequality. Hout's sociological approach relies on detailed statistical analyses of large surveys and census data—in common with Otis Duncan and Peter Blau, and earlier Paul Lazarsfeld—and he is responsible for numerous methodological innovations. He has also published books that summarize and expand on the topics of his research in a more accessible style, including Following in Father's Footsteps: Social Mobility in Ireland, Inequality by Design: Cracking the Bell Curve Myth, The Truth about Conservative Christians: What They Think and What They Believe, and Century of Difference.

== Early life and career ==
Michael Hout was born on May 14, 1950, in Pittsburgh, Pennsylvania, where his family was rooted in the local community. His father worked for 35 years as a bus driver for Greyhound, while his mother initially sold children’s shoes at a neighborhood shop before transitioning to an office role at an insurance company downtown. Hout grew up with three siblings, all of whom still reside in Pittsburgh. Hout initially planned to pursue a career in high school education, but his academic interests shifted during his undergraduate years at the University of Pittsburgh under the guidance of two professors: historian David Montgomery and sociologist Brian Vargus. In 1972, Hout graduated from the University of Pittsburgh with a bachelor’s degree in sociology and history. Hout was encouraged by Vargus to continue his academic journey in sociology at Indiana University Bloomington. He attended Indiana University and received his doctorate in sociology in 1976 under Phillips Cutright.

Hout joined the University of Arizona as an assistant professor of sociology in 1976. He became an associate professor at the University of California, Berkeley in 1985. He was a visiting professor at University College Dublin in 1991. He remained at Berkeley until 2013, when he became a professor at New York University and director of its Center for Advanced Social Science Research.

Hout has been involved with the General Social Survey (GSS) as chair of the GSS Board of Overseers (1997–2001) and co-principal investigator (2009–2016). He has worked on large-scale projects like the American Opportunity Study. Hout is also on the board of the Societal Expert Action Network (SEAN), sponsored by the Division of Behavioral and Social Sciences and Education (DBASSE) at the National Academies of Science, Engineering and Medicine (NASEM), which focuses on NASEM's Climate Change Crossroads and the opioid crisis. The committee issued a number of Rapid Expert Consultations advising the nation on how social science evidence could contribute to social policies and public health.

== Research ==
=== Sociological Methodology ===
Hout has contributed to social survey techniques and empirical methods. Mobility Tables (1983) described methods for analyzing tables of cross-classified data relating individuals' occupational origins and destinations, for the study of intergenerational effects on socioeconomic achievement in particular. The work systematically presented a progression of statistical models for analyzing mobility tables, beginning with basic tests for perfect mobility and advancing to more complex models of partial mobility. The work addressed shortcomings in certain applications of chi-squared tests, suggesting the addition of the G-test, whose statistic can also be used for model selection. The work also formalized various log-linear models, where the logarithm of each table entry is a linear sum of a reduced set of variables. With Michael Sobel and Otis Duncan, Hout explored the quasi-symmetric case in mobility tables, developing a parametrization that separated exchange and structural mobility. Hout later developed models to analyze trends in time.

With Leo A. Goodman, Hout developed a general regression-type model to measure the effect of a third variable on a two-way association between qualitative variables. He introduced uniform association models that disentangle the impact of social background, education, and labor market conditions from purely individual attributes. Hout's later work integrated multilevel and longitudinal approaches to capture cohort effects and time-based shifts in phenomena such as religious affiliation and occupational structure. As has shown that macro-level transformations—whether in class identification or faith communities—cannot be fully understood without considering how births, deaths, and generational replacement intersect with cultural variables.

As part of Hout's involvement with the General Social Survey, he worked on the digitization of occupational data, standardizing decades of survey responses to the 2010 census classification—a move that "allowed researchers to systematically analyze long-term occupational trends under a consistent coding scheme, thereby enabling new insights into social mobility, class identification, and demographic change." He also investigated and quantified uncertainties on survey responses.

=== Social Mobility and Inequality ===
Hout has studied inequality and intergenerational mobility, including dimensions of inequality, including economic status, education, race, and gender. He investigates these factors to unequal life chances and the accessibility of resources, shaping individuals' experiences and opportunities. Hout's research involves tracking changes in inequality over time. His studies use longitudinal data to assess how shifting economic policies, educational attainment, and demographic trends affect levels of inequality. Inequality by Design: Cracking the Bell Curve Myth argued that the hyper-individualism of inequality studies like The Bell Curve captured some significant aspects of the rank of individuals but could never account for the rapidly growing inequality of jobs, wages, and family outcomes, and life chances. It expanded on work Hout completed on the interaction between socioeconomic background and higher education in social mobility in the United States and Europe.

One of Hout's most notable works, "Maximally Maintained Inequality: Expansion, Reform, and Opportunity in Irish Education, 1921-75" examines the persistence of social class differences in educational attainment despite the expansion of secondary education in Ireland. The study concluded that educational expansion alone does not necessarily reduce social inequality. Instead, structural factors such as economic incentives, cultural expectations, and institutional constraints play a significant role in maintaining class disparities in education.

In his 2012 article, “Social and Economic Returns to College Education in the United States” Hout explores the debate over whether education primarily reflects pre-existing advantages or has an independent effect on socioeconomic outcomes. The study found that higher education has a positive causal impact, particularly for individuals from backgrounds less likely to pursue higher education. It suggests that college attendance can contribute to greater social mobility.

Inequality by Design: Cracking the Bell Curve Myth (1996), co-authored by Claude S. Fischer, Michael Hout, Martín Sánchez Jankowski, Samuel R. Lucas, Ann Swidler, and Kim Voss, served as a response to The Bell Curve (1994) by Charles Murray and Richard Herrnstein. Using data from the National Longitudinal Study of Youth and IQ measures from the Armed Forces Qualifying Test, the authors analyzed the relationship between intelligence measures and social inequality. Their analysis found that measured IQ accounts for approximately 10 percent of the variation in earnings, concluding that American income inequality would show little change if everyone had the same test score. The book challenges several core arguments about intelligence and social inequality. The authors argue that intelligence is not a singular construct and is more influenced by schooling content and family resources than genetics. In examining social policy implications, they point to factors such as the relationship between poverty risk and variables like gender and marital status, noting that groups with different poverty rates often show similar IQ scores. Chapter 8 specifically addresses racial differences in test performance through cross-cultural comparisons. The authors examine how various groups, such as the Irish in Great Britain or Koreans in Japan, perform on standardized tests when facing similar social conditions. They argue that group differences in test scores reflect social inequalities rather than inherent capabilities, summarized in their conclusion that "Groups score unequally on tests because they are unequal in society". In a review in Political Science Quarterly, Lawrence Bobo noted that while the book was highly readable, it was primarily directed at an academic audience. The review also noted that some alternative perspectives, such as the role of educational tracking, received limited attention in the work.

=== Religion ===
Hout has explored several areas in the sociology of religion. A major finding was summarized in the title of his 2002 paper "Why More Americans Have No Religious Preference: Politics and Generations," written with Claude S. Fischer. Hout found that the rise in religious disaffiliation is tied to the growing politicization of religion in American life, particularly the alignment of conservative religious groups with right-wing politics. He also found demographic effects such as differential birth rates to be significant.

Earlier work by Hout focused on methodological concerns. In "The Center Doesn't Hold: Church Attendance in the United States, 1940–1984" (1987), Hout and Andrew Greeley wrote that "official attendance counts fail to capture the ebb and flow of religious participation," highlighting the tendency of individuals to overreport churchgoing and the danger of relying exclusively on institutional figures. These findings anticipated their later argument in "The Secularization Myth" (1989) that perceived religious decline may be overstated when demographic evidence — especially birth rates, intergenerational retention, and survey-based nuances — is overlooked. At the same time, Hout and Greeley's "Musical Chairs: Patterns of Denominational Change in the United States" (1988) underscored the complexity of affiliation switching: Catholics, Protestants, and others frequently shifted denominational ties without necessarily abandoning religion entirely. He has also noted that individuals' religious affiliations can weaken over time then reemerge with marriage, childbirth, or other family-related events.

In investigating the socioeconomic effects of religious discrimination in Northern Ireland, Hout found that class more significantly limited social mobility than religion. Likewise, in "Religion and Happiness" he reported that while religious affiliation can contribute to greater subjective well-being for some, the connection between religion and happiness is mediated by various social factors, including political beliefs, social class, and personal life experiences.

Hout, with Andrew M. Greeley, in The Truth About Conservative Christians examined the beliefs, practices, and political views of conservative Christians in American society. Using data from the General Social Survey from 1972 to 2004, the authors analyze various aspects of conservative Christian life, including religious beliefs, voting patterns, political ideology, attitudes about freedom and inequality, and demographic characteristics. The research challenges common media portrayals of conservative Christians as a monolithic group, finding more diverse and nuanced views among them. The book argues that while conservative Christians are more likely than other Protestants to hold conservative positions on issues like abortion and to vote Republican, these correlations are not as strong as often portrayed. The authors found that the additional Republican vote among Conservative Protestants, compared to Mainline American Protestants, was approximately seven percentage points. Some book reviewers rejected the interpretation of these data, however, while otherwise commending the nuanced reportage. In analyzing race and religion, the work examined how racial identity intersects with and reshapes the relationship between Conservative Protestantism and conservative politics. The authors also developed a classification scheme that treated African-American religious bodies separately from other Protestant denominations due to their distinct historical traditions.

=== Political attitudes ===
Hout has explored how social class, race, and education influence political attitudes and voting behavior. His findings often illustrate the ways in which individuals’ social positions shape their political preferences and perceptions of government. For instance, his work has documented shifts in voting patterns and political engagement, particularly within specific demographics. He has continued this work in examining changes in public opinion over time, particularly around critical issues like race, immigration, and economic inequality. He has been instrumental in analyzing the growing polarization in American political attitudes, contributing to the understanding of how group identities and socioeconomic factors fuel divisive political climates.

Hout has been studying political attitudes across different social classes since the mid-1970s. Hout has studied the differences between left and right leaning American voters across the intersectionality of race and religion. He studied political leanings on immigration with the turmoil over the 2016 election. Hout has also studied attitudes towards abortion, and how political divides have become more prominent than any other identifying factor. Hout has also observed with the GSS that the extent of opinions has also increased in recent years. Additionally, Hout studies voting patterns amongst different societal groups, attempting to explain voting blocks. Most recently, Hout has worked on how marital status could affect how one decides to vote in elections. He has also studied ethic attachments and class voting patterns.

Hout gave a descriptive account of changing political opinions, alongside shifting demographics, in the United States over the course of the twentieth century in Century of Difference, written with Claude S. Fischer. The authors described a general liberalizing trend of opinions, with fluctuations described by a "diffusion model," though they noted that opinions on abortion and the death penalty were unique cases.

== Awards and honors ==
Michael Hout was elected to the American Academy of Arts & Sciences in 1997, the National Academy of Sciences in 2003, the American Philosophical Society in 2006, the American Academy of Political and Social Sciences in 2018, and the American Association of the Advancement of Science in 2021.

He received the Robert M. Hauser Award from the American Sociological Association's Inequality, Poverty, and Mobility Section in 2018. In 2016, the University College Dublin conferred on him the honorary degree of Doctors of Letters. He was awarded the Otis Dudley Duncan Award for Century of Difference by the American Sociological Association's section on Population in 2007, and the Clifford C. Clogg Memorial Award for Inequality by Design given by the Population Association of America in 1996.

== Selected works ==
=== Journal articles ===
- "Status, Autonomy, and Training in Occupational Mobility" (1984)
- "More Universalism, Less Structural Mobility: The American Occupational Structure in the 1980s" (1988)
- "Maximally Maintained Inequality: Expansion, Reform, and Opportunity in Irish Education, 1921-75" (1993), with Adrian Raftery
- "The Persistence of Classes in Post-Industrial Societies" (1993), with Clem Brooks and Jeff Manza
- "Educational Stratification in Russia during the Soviet Period" (1995), with Theodore P. Gerber
- "The Democratic Class Struggle in the United States, 1948-1992" (1995), with Clem Brooks and Jeff Manza
- "Abortion Politics in the United States, 1972–1994: From Single Issue to Ideology" (1999)
- "Self-Employment, Family Background, and Race" (2000), with Harvey S. Rosen
- "Why More Americans Have No Religious Preference: Politics and Generations" (2002), with Claude S. Fischer
- "Distinguishing the Geographic Levels and Social Dimensions of US Metropolitan Segregation, 1960–2000" (2004), with Claude S. Fischer, Gretchen Stockmayer, and Jon Stiles
- "Intergenerational Social Mobility: The United States in Comparative Perspective" (2006), with Emily Beller
- "Social and Economic Returns to College Education in the United States" (2012)
- "Explaining Why More Americans Have No Religious Preference: Political Backlash and Generational Succession, 1987-2012" (2014), with Claude S. Fischer
- "Americans' Occupational Status Reflects the Status of Both of Their Parents" (2018)
- "Immigration, Race & Political Polarization" (2021), with Christopher Maggio

=== Books ===
- Mobility Tables (1983)
- Following in Father's Footsteps: Social Mobility in Ireland (1989)
- Inequality by Design: Cracking the Bell Curve Myth (1996)
- The Truth about Conservative Christians: What They Think and What They Believe (2006)
- Century of Difference (2006)
