= Russell Jacoby =

American historian (born 1945)

Russell Jacoby (born April 23, 1945) is an American academic and a professor of history at the University of California, Los Angeles (UCLA), an author and a critic of academic culture. His fields of interest are twentieth-century European and American intellectual and cultural history, specifically the history of intellectuals and education. At these points, his work, however, also crosses over into the sociology of knowledge.

As of 2013, he was professor in residence (an untenured position) at the UCLA department of history, and had taken emeritus status by 2022. A documentary, Velvet Prisons: Russell Jacoby on American Academia, premiered in 2013 and played at many festivals, including the Humanity Explored Film Festival, the Davis International Film Festival, and Columbia Gorge Film Festival.

He was born in New York City and educated at the University of Chicago and the University of Wisconsin–Madison. He received a doctorate in 1974 from the University of Rochester.

His parents were Jewish and active in left-wing politics, shifting their politics only in later life.

== Published works (selection) ==
- Social Amnesia: A Critique of Contemporary Psychology (Beacon Press, 1975; Transaction, 1997)
- "What is Conformist Marxism?" Telos 45 (Fall 1980). New York: Telos Press.
- Dialectic of Defeat: Contours of Western Marxism (Cambridge University Press, 1981)
- The Repression of Psychoanalysis: Otto Fenichel and the Political Freudians (Basic Books, 1983)
- The Last Intellectuals: American Culture in the Age of Academe (Basic Books, 1987; new edition with new Introduction, Basic Books 2000)
- Dogmatic Wisdom: How the Culture Wars Divert Education and Distract America (Doubleday, 1994)
- The Bell Curve Debate: History, Documents, Opinions (Times Books, 1995).
- The End of Utopia: Politics and Culture in the Age of Apathy (Basic Books, 1999)
- Picture Imperfect: Utopian Thought for an Anti-Utopian Age (Columbia University Press, 2005)
- Bloodlust: On the Roots of Violence from Cain and Abel to the Present (Free Press, 2011)
- On Diversity: The Eclipse of the Individual in a Global Era (Seven Stories Press, 2020)
- Intellectuals in Politics and Academia: Culture in the Age of Hype (Palgrave Macmillan, 2022)

Such as other articles and reviews in American Historical Review, Grand Street, The Nation, Los Angeles Times, London Review of Books, The New York Times, Harper's and elsewhere.

== Awards ==
- Guggenheim Fellowship awarded 1980
- National Endowment for the Humanities (NEH) Fellowship
- Andrew Mellon Fellowship
- Lehrman Fellowship awarded 1999 (Gilder Lehrman Institute of American History)
