= Intelligence: Knowns and Unknowns =

1995 scientific report on human intelligence

Intelligence: Knowns and Unknowns is a report about scientific findings on human intelligence, issued in 1995 by a task force created by the Board of Scientific Affairs of the American Psychological Association (APA) following the publication of The Bell Curve and the scholarly debate that followed it. The report was subsequently published in the February 1996 issue of the peer-reviewed journal American Psychologist.

== Background ==
The Board of Scientific Affairs (BSA) of the APA had concluded that after the publication of The Bell Curve (1994) and the following debate that there were "serious misunderstandings" and "that there was urgent need for an authoritative report on these issues—one that all sides could use as a basis for discussion". Furthermore, "Another unfortunate aspect of the debate was that many participants made little effort to distinguish scientific issues from political ones, Research findings were often assessed not so much on their merits or their scientific standing as on their supposed political implications." The report stated that "The charge to our Task Force was to prepare a dispassionate survey of the state of the art: to make clear what has been scientifically established, what is presently in dispute, and what is still unknown. In fulfilling that charge, the only recommendations we shall make are for further research and calmer debate."

Published in August 1995, the report was authored by a task force of 11 experts. The APA Board on the Advancement of Psychology in the Public Interest (BAPPI) nominated one member of the Task Force. The Committee on Psychological Tests and Assessment nominated another. A third was nominated by the APA Council of Representatives. The other members were chosen by an extended consultative process with the aim of representing a broad range of expertise and opinion. Ulric Neisser was appointed chair. Members of BSA and BAPPI were asked to comment on a preliminary draft of the report. The entire Task Force gave unanimous support to the final report. An edited version of Intelligence: Knowns and Unknowns was published in the journal American Psychologist in February 1996.

== Findings ==
Intelligence: Knowns and Unknowns stated that many different theories of intelligence have been proposed. Many questions were still unanswered.

The report states that psychometric testing is the most influential approach to conceptualizing intelligence while test scores can predict individual differences in intelligence. Further, intelligence is subject to a combination of genetic and environmental variables.

=== General intelligence factor ===
Most research had been done on psychometric testing which was also by far the most widely used in practical settings. Intelligence quotient (IQ) tests do correlate with one another and that the view that the general intelligence factor (g) is a statistical artifact is a minority one. IQ scores are fairly stable during development in the sense that while a child's reasoning ability increases, the child's relative ranking in comparison to that of other individuals of the same age is fairly stable during development.

=== IQ correlation with skills and grades ===
The report stated that IQ scores measure important skills as they correlate fairly well (0.5) with grades. This implied that the explained variance (given certain linear assumptions) is 25%. "Wherever it has been studied, children with high scores on tests of intelligence tend to learn more of what is taught in school than their lower-scoring peers. There may be styles of teaching and methods of instruction that will decrease or increase this correlation, but none that consistently eliminates it has yet been found."

=== IQ correlation with school achievement tests ===
IQ scores also correlated with school achievement tests designed to measure knowledge of the curriculum. Other personal characteristics affecting this may be persistence, interest in school, and willingness to study which may be influenced by the degree of encouragement for academic achievement a child receives and more general cultural factors. Test scores were the best single predictor of an individual's years of education. They were somewhat more important than social class as measured by occupation/education of parents.

=== IQ correlation with measures of job performance ===
IQ scores were also correlated (0.3–0.5) with various measures of job performance such as supervisor ratings and work samples. The correlations were higher when the unreliability of such measures were controlled for. IQ scores were sometimes described as the "best available predictor" of job performance. Intelligence test scores did correlate significantly with social status and income later in life. They were somewhat less important for this than parental SES although the effects of parental SES and IQ were hard to separate. IQ tests had lower negative correlations with certain socially undesirable outcomes such as that children with high IQ were less likely to engage in juvenile crime. One example being a study finding a correlation of −0.19 (−0.17 with social class controlled for) between IQ scores and number of juvenile offenses in a large Danish sample. This implied that the explained variance (given certain linear assumptions) is less than 4% for these negative outcomes.

=== Genetic and environmental variables ===
While both genetic and environmental variables were involved in the manifestation of intelligence, the role of genetics had been shown to increase in importance with age. In particular, the effect of the family environment shared by all children in a family, while important in early childhood, became quite small (zero in some studies) by late adolescence. Why this occurs is unclear. One possibility is that people with different genes tend to seek out different environments that reinforce the effects of those genes. Nonetheless, there were several important environmental factors which were known to affect IQ, such as having received very poor or interrupted schooling.

=== Interventions ===
However, regarding interventions such as the Head Start Program and similar programs lasting one or two years, while producing initial IQ gains, these had disappeared by the end of elementary school, although there may be other benefits such as more likely to finish high school. The more intensive Abecedarian Project had produced more long-lasting gains.

=== Other biological factors ===
The report stated that a number of biological factors, including malnutrition, exposure to toxic substances, and various prenatal and perinatal factors, resulted in lowered IQ under at least some conditions. The much-discussed "Flynn effect", which refers to the striking worldwide mean IQ increase over time, seemed too large to have simply reflected increased test sophistication. Possible explanations included improved nutrition and more complex environment. It was also unclear to what degree the IQ increase reflected real gain in intelligence.

=== Group differences ===
The report states that group differences in intelligence continue to be the subject of intense interest and debate. Reasons include social, psychological, political, and legal. The report states that "the facts about group differences may be relevant to the need for (and the effectiveness of) affirmative action programs". However, the report specifically states that it does not make any policy recommendations.

Regarding sex differences so have most standard tests of intelligence been constructed to show equal results, but some studies show small differences. Males do better on visual-spatial tasks, with a particularly large difference on mental rotation (nearly 1 SD), which is significant for their generally better performance in tasks that involve aiming and throwing. Males also do relatively better on tests of proportional and mechanical reasoning as well as on mathematics. Females do better on verbal tests and some memory tests. They do relatively better in tests of literature, English composition, Spanish, reading, and spelling. More males have dyslexia and stuttering. Possible causes include gender roles and differences in brain structure which in turn may be due to genetics and/or environment. Differences in sex hormones may be another explanation. Female exposure to high levels of male hormones in utero is associated with higher spatial abilities and with more play with "boys' toys" and less with 'girls' toys". Males with higher testosterone levels do better on visuo-spatial abilities and worse on verbal abilities. Older males given testosterone score better on visuo-spatial tests.

As the measured differences in average intelligence between various ethnic groups reflect complex patterns, no overall generalization about them was appropriate. Regarding Asian Americans, studies had shown slightly lower to slightly higher scores compared to White Americans. Average IQ in East Asian nations had been reported as equal to or substantially above the American average. Asians did particularly well on spatial tests. Their knowledge of mathematics were above that predicted from IQ scores which may reflect cultural differences or higher spatial ability. Their occupational achievement were also higher than predicted by IQ scores, with Asians with IQs slightly below 100 having occupational achievements typically seen in persons with IQs from 110 to 120. According to the report, "These 'over-achievements' serve as sharp reminders of the limitations of IQ-based prediction." In addition to cultural factors, gene-based temperamental factor may also have been important.

Hispanics scores typically were between those of Blacks and Whites. Linguistic factors may have been particularly important for this group with many not speaking English well or English not their first language. This may have been reflected in higher scores on performance than on verbal subtests. Nevertheless, for young children the WISC-R had reasonably high correlations with school achievement measures. Standard aptitude tests predicted first-year college grades about as well for Hispanic high school students with moderate to high English proficiency as they did for non Hispanic Whites.

Native Americans were culturally and linguistically diverse as well as living in widely varying settings. Groups, like the Inuit, who lived in the arctic tended to do particularly well, with no substantial sex difference, on visual-spatial skills. This likely represented a genetic and/or learned adaptation to the difficult arctic environment. Many Indian children had chronic middle-ear infections, and the resulting hearing loss can have marked negative effects on verbal tests. This may have been related to the relatively lower verbal scores for this group.

There was a long-standing 15 point (or 1 standard deviation) difference between the intelligence test scores of African Americans and White Americans, though the authors state that it might have narrowed slightly in the then recent years. The difference was largest on those tests, verbal or non-verbal, that best represented the general intelligence factor (g). Controlled studies of the way the tests were formulated and administered had shown that this did not contribute substantially to the difference. Attempts to devise tests that would minimize disadvantages of this kind had been unsuccessful. The scores predicted future achievement equally well for Blacks and Whites, but not for Asians, who often outperformed what would ordinarily be expected in terms of job performance. With regard to the potential causes of these gaps, the authors stated that there was insufficient evidence at the time to make conclusions.

Today, the scientific consensus is that genetics does not explain observed differences in average IQ test performance between groups, and that these differences are environmental in origin. (Note: Attributed to multiple sources:)

== Members of the task force ==
- Ulric Neisser (Chair), Emory University
- Gwyneth Boodoo, Educational Testing Service
- Thomas J. Bouchard, Jr., University of Minnesota
- A. Wade Boykin, Howard University
- Nathan Brody, Wesleyan University
- Stephen J. Ceci, Cornell University
- Diane F. Halpern, California State University, San Bernardino
- John C. Loehlin, University of Texas, Austin
- Robert Perloff, University of Pittsburgh
- Robert J. Sternberg, Yale University
- Susana Urbina, University of North Florida

== See also ==
- History of the race and intelligence controversy
- Race and intelligence
