= Joseph Fagan =

American psychologist

- Born: Joseph Francis Fagan III; September 7, 1941; Hartford, Connecticut
- Died: August 10, 2013 (aged 71); Cleveland, Ohio
- Education: University of Connecticut
- Spouse: Cynthia Holland
- Scientific career
- Fields: Psychology
- Workplaces: Case Western Reserve University
- Thesis: Short-term memory processes in normal and retarded children (1967)
- Academic advisors: Sam Witryol

Joseph F. Fagan III (September 7, 1941 – August 10, 2013) was an American psychologist and the Lucy Adams Leffingwell Professor of psychology at Case Western Reserve University from 1990 until his death in 2013.

== Education ==
Fagan received his B.A. from the University of Hartford in 1963 and his M.A. and Ph.D. from the University of Connecticut in 1965 and 1967, respectively.

== Career ==
Fagan joined the faculty of Case Western Reserve University in 1968, and became a full professor there ten years later. In 1990, he received the endowed Leffingwell professorship at Case Western, and from 1990 to 1995 he chaired the Department of Psychological Sciences there.

== Research ==
Fagan was known for his research into intelligence testing of infants, and he developed one such test that can predict how successful an infant will be when he or she begins taking classes, as well as another test that he said could predict the likelihood of an infant developing a mental disability by age 3. He also conducted research on the relationship between race and intelligence, and concluded from this research that the black-white IQ gap was due to environmental factors. He also published a number of studies in the early 1980s that found a correlation between novelty preference among infants and their later cognitive test scores. His research has also found a link between infant IQ test scores and academic achievement by age 21. He conducted much of his research along with his wife, Cynthia Holland, a professor of psychology at Cuyahoga Community College.

== Death ==
Fagan died on August 10, 2013, of pancreatic cancer, at the age of 71. In his honor, Case Western created the Joseph F. Fagan, III Award for Research Excellence, which is awarded annually to "a graduate student in the Department of Psychological Sciences who demonstrates a passion and commitment to research excellence."
