= Inequality by Design =

1996 book

Inequality by Design: Cracking the Bell Curve Myth
- Authors: Claude S. Fischer, Michael Hout, Martín Sánchez Jankowski, Samuel R. Lucas, Ann Swidler, Kim Voss
- Subject: The Bell Curve
- Publisher: Princeton University Press
- Publication date: 1996
- Media type: Print
- Pages: 324
- ISBN: 978-0691028989

Inequality by Design: Cracking the Bell Curve Myth is a 1996 book by Claude S. Fischer, Michael Hout, Martín Sánchez Jankowski, Samuel R. Lucas, Ann Swidler, and Kim Voss. The book is a reply to The Bell Curve (1994) by Charles Murray and Richard Herrnstein and attempts to show that the arguments in The Bell Curve are flawed, that the data used by Murray and Herrnstein do not support their conclusion and that alternative explanations (particularly the effects of social inequality) better explain differences in IQ scores than genetic explanations.

== The Bell Curve and social inequality ==
The book's particular focus is the book The Bell Curve, but to some extent, this focus is to illustrate a doctrine that the authors attempt to refute:

At its base is a philosophy ages old: Human misery is natural and beyond human re-demption; inequality is fated; and people deserve, by virtue of their native talents, the positions they have in society. From that ideological base, Herrnstein and Murray build a case that critics cannot simply dismiss out of hand.

Fischer et al. contend that Herrnstein and Murray's data explain, at best, only a limited amount of social inequality in the United States (between 5% and 10%) and that the analysis of the data in The Bell Curve is itself flawed.

== Subordinate ethnic groups ==
In later chapters, the book examines the supposed lower intelligence of a variety of ethnic groups in different societies and time periods. The book claims that ethnic groups placed in a subordinate role in the caste system (or caste-like system) have poor school and test performance.

subordination means material deprivation for students, which in turn impairs their achievement; two, subordination usually involves group segregation and concentration, which, by multiplying disadvantage and drawing all group members into difficult learning situations, undercuts academic achievement; and three, subordination produces a stigmatized identity of inferiority, which in turn breeds resignation or rebellion, both of which limit academic achievement. The histories of African Americans and Latino Americans, as well as their current conditions, more than suffice to explain why their members tend to score lower than whites on tests and also why they do less well in the race for success. The American case fits the global pattern; it is not genes but caste positions that explain the apparent differences in cognitive performance.

Notable examples of such groups include Koreans in Japan compared with Koreans in the United States, and the supposed change in perception of Jews in the United States from being regarded as "dull" in the early twentieth century to being regarded as part of a "cognitive elite" now.

== Reviews ==
- Boston Globe, "Studies hit Bell Curve linking of race, IQ books say environment, not heredity, is major determinant of intelligence", May 7, 1996 Author: John Yemma, Globe Staff
- Civil Rights Journal, September 22, 1997 Author: Carlson, Ken
- New Statesman, Vol. 125 Issue 4315, "Nurture v nature". 12/20/96-01/03/97 Author: Malik, Kenan
- Personnel Psychology, Vol. 50, Issue 3, 741-746. "Review of Inequality by design: Cracking the Bell Curve myth, by C. S. Fischer, M. Hout, M. S. Jankowski, S. R. Lucas, A. Swidler, & K. Voss. P." Date: 1997. Author: Gottfredson, Linda
- Journal of the American Statistical Association, Date: March 1, 1999 Author: Sconing, James
