= Effort optimism =

Effort optimism is the confidence that acquiring the skills valued by the majority of society, such as those skills measured by IQ tests, ACT, and SATs, are worthwhile. This outlook is grounded on different cultural belief systems that link effort with success.

== Effort and Success ==
Effort optimism refers to how strongly a student believes their hard work in school will pay off with academic success. This outlook aligns with cultural emphasis on perseverance in the face of academic setbacks. A strong conviction generally results in greater success and can become a self-fulfilling prophecy, reinforcing that belief. When that conviction is weak or nonexistent, students generally experience less success, reinforcing the belief that effort doesn't matter.

Studies on learning motivation show that cultural views strongly impact is effort optimism is a noted phenomena. For example, studies on learning motivation show that Japanese educational culture strongly views academic success as a direct result of effort, rather than innate intelligence. Studies evaluating gifted and average students in countries like Germany note that European students demonstrate a much higher reliance on intrinsic interest and mastery goals than on public tracking mechanisms or the belief that continuous effort will yield a higher IQ score. Success is often attributed to structured competency development and personal autonomy rather than competitive, absolute effort maximization.

Lack of effort optimism has been described as a crucial part of the achievement gap of students of Black, Hispanic, and Native American backgrounds in the American educational system. Among Black minorities, parents articulate a strong belief in education and its role in getting ahead but communicate an ambivalence about whether society will reward school achievement. In this interpretation, said students may underachieve because of ambivalence regarding the potential impact for performing well in the school system translating to advances socially.

== Causes of Effort Optimism ==
Effort optimism levels, values, and causes are multifaceted and vary depending on where in the world one is studying. Even within a country there are differences by region, urban vs rural, as well as differences in attitudes about its efficacy by ethnic groups.

In the US, White and Asia students have typically shown high levels of effort optimism that seem to serve as self-fulfilling prophecies. The level is then transmuted to subsequent generations. Since before the Brown vs. Board of Education decision in 1954, African American, Hispanic, and Native American minority students have not achieved similar outcomes to white American students. Educational resources are not uniformly distributed in the US as the US has a system where local tax supports local schools. In predominantly white US school districts, spending on educational resources, such as highly qualified teachers, Advanced Placement courses, and updated textbooks, is on average 10 times higher. Even Black and Hispanic students whose scores on standardized academic tracking tests were equal to those of white students were more likely to be placed in lower course levels than Whites were. Inequalities present within the educational system poses a real threat to the future of minority students.

Another factor in effort optimism is the concept of Stereotype threat, which describes the process of one's fear of confirming a negative stereotype leading that individual to become that negative stereotype. This theory connects to this issue because stereotypes are consistently made about people of color. For example, a common and misinformed stereotype is that black people do not perform well on standardized tests, whereas white people do. The disparities in performance on standardized tests stem from but structural inequities as opposed to skin color. However, when Black people are subjected to harassment almost daily, and reminded of this stereotype constantly, some may fall into the stereotype out of fear of conforming to it.

In Standardized Tests, people of color are at a significant disadvantage. As discussed in the previous paragraphs, because of the inequality present within the educational system, people of color are less likely to perform well on standardized tests because most are not prepared enough for these tests. This is due primarily to their schools' inability to teach them the material for lack of sufficient funds. One example of this is Debra P. vs. Turlington, a controversial court case that was documented based on racial bias in standardized testing. The SSAT II was deemed unconstitutional because students were either denied or granted their high school diplomas based on whether or not they passed the test. The courts found that this test had a disproportionately negative impact on black students, and the state of Florida admitted that they were knowingly setting a precedent for these students not to graduate. Students of color were unprepared for a test soaked in discrimination, which set them up for failure.

== Consequences Involved with Effort Optimism ==
Because of effort optimism, under-education is very prevalent in society. In the United States, under-education is a significant problem for minorities. As stated above, people of color are seriously under-educated compared to white people. Apart from major financial gaps, people of color face other problems, such as a lack of motivation to further their education because they are told beginning in their youth that they are not as important as whites, literally or figuratively. A study conducted in 2004 by the Harvard Education Publishing Group showed that people of color are less likely to obtain post-secondary degrees after high school because so many of them never graduate high school.

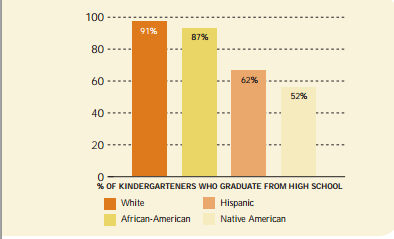
Number of Kindergartners that Graduate High School by Race

Significant consequences follow not graduating high school. In today's society, almost every career requires a college or even graduate degree. The rate of unemployment in the United States is very high and is significantly higher for those without a college education. Unemployment in the United States in 2014 is approximately 4.5% for those with a college degree and 12.5% for those without a high school diploma.

These consequences can be averted if we are not taught in our youth that we can't do something. If children in schools are taught the curricula that are needed to accomplish these so-called impossible tasks, then there would be more high school graduates. There would be more people interested in pursuing post-secondary education. It would help even more if education is taught based on learning and intelligence, not one's race. Effort optimism would not be relevant if all students were taught equally and there was no divide between majority and minority students in schools.

== See also ==
- Learned helplessness
- Learned optimism

== Books ==
- Jim Crow's Children: The Broken Promise of the Brown Decision - Peter H. Irons
