= Sidney Segalowitz =

Canadian psychologist

Sidney J. Segalowitz is a Canadian psychologist and neuroscientist who is a professor of psychology at Brock University. He received his Ph.D. from Cornell University. He is known for his research using electroencephalography to study brain activity associated with human behavioral phenotypes.
