= The Bell Curve Debate =

1995 book edited by Russell Jacoby and Naomi Glauberman

The Bell Curve Debate: History, Documents, Opinions
- Editors: Russell Jacoby, Naomi Glauberman
- Language: English
- Subject: The Bell Curve
- Publisher: Random House
- Publication date: 1995
- Publication place: United States
- Media type: Print (paperback)
- Pages: 720
- ISBN: 0-8129-2587-4
- OCLC: 31969295
- Dewey Decimal: 305.9/082 20
- LC Class: BF431 .B3748 1995

The Bell Curve Debate is a 1995 book edited by the historian Russell Jacoby and the writer Naomi Glauberman.

== Summary ==
A response to The Bell Curve (1994), by the psychologist Richard Herrnstein and the political scientist Charles Murray, The Bell Curve Debate includes 81 articles by 81 authors. Contemporary authors whose writings are collected in the book include K. Anthony Appiah, Gregg Easterbrook, Howard Gardner, Eugene D. Genovese, Nathan Glazer, Stephen Jay Gould, Bob Herbert, Richard Herrnstein, Christopher Hitchens, Irving Louis Horowitz, Arthur Jensen, Leon J. Kamin, Charles Lane, Glenn C. Loury, Richard E. Nisbett, Nell Irvin Painter, Hugh Pearson, Adolph Reed Jr., Carl Rowan, Alan Ryan, Brent Staples, Ellen Willis, and Christopher Winship. Jacoby and Glauberman republish historical materials by authors including Carl Brigham, Theodosius Dobzhansky, Francis Galton, Walter Lippmann, Karl Pearson, and Lewis Terman. The publisher, Times Books, describes the book as a compilation of "the best of recent reviews and essays, and salient documents drawn from the curious history of this heated debate" capturing "the fervor, anger, and scope of an almost unprecedented national argument over the very idea of democracy and the possibility of a tolerant, multiracial America. It is an essential companion and answer to The Bell Curve and provides scholarship and polemic from every point of view."

== See also ==
- History of the race and intelligence controversy
