= Claude S. Fischer =

American sociologist (born 1948)

Claude Serge Fischer
- Born: January 9, 1948 (age 78); Paris, France
- Citizenship: American
- Education: University of California, Los Angeles; Harvard University
- Known for: Urban sociology American social history
- Scientific career
- Fields: Sociology
- Workplaces: University of California, Berkeley

Claude Serge Fischer (born January 9, 1948) is an American sociologist and Professor of Sociology at the University of California, Berkeley. He has taught undergraduate and graduate courses in urban sociology, research methods, and American society at UC Berkeley. He was elected a Member of the American Philosophical Society in 2017.

== Early life and career ==
Fischer was born in Paris, France on January 9, 1948. He came to the United States in 1952 at the age of 4. He was raised in Paterson, New Jersey, but finished high school in Los Angeles, California. He graduated from Fairfax High School.

Fischer graduated with a B.A. in sociology from the University of California, Los Angeles in 1968. After completing his B.A., he went to Harvard University and completed his M.A. (1970) and Ph.D. (1972) in sociology. After completing his Ph.D., he joined the faculty at the University of California, Berkeley in 1972.

== Work ==
Fischer's early research focused on the social psychology of urban life and on social networks. In 1982, he published the book To Dwell Among Friends: Personal Networks in Town and City and in 1984, he published the book The Urban Experience. He is credited with developing the 'subcultural theory of urbanism'. He worked on the study of social networks, in which he developed techniques for the survey study of networks and studied urban-rural differences in personal networks.

He has also worked on American social history, beginning with a study of the early telephone's place in social life. He published the book America Calling: A Social History of the Telephone to 1940 in 1992. In that book, he presents the first social history of this vital but little-studied technology. He examine how Americans encountered, tested, and ultimately embraced it with enthusiasm. He was also the founding editor of Contexts, the American Sociological Association's magazine of sociology for the general reader. He was also its executive editor through 2004.

== Awards and honors ==
Fischer and his books have received many awards and honors. The following are the awards and honors received by Fischer and his books.

- 1986 Distinguished Scholarship Award of the Pacific Sociological Association for To Dwell Among Friends (1982)
- 1995 Dexter Prize, Outstanding Book, from the Society for the History of Technology, for America Calling (1992)
- 1996 Robert and Helen Lynd Award, from the Community and Urban Sociology Section of the American Sociological Association, for distinguished lifetime contribution to urban and community studies
- Inequality by Design: Cracking the Bell Curve Myth (1996) was awarded “Outstanding Book” on Human Rights, Gustavus Myers Center for the Study of Human Rights in North America in 1998
- Century of Difference (2006) was a co-winner of the 2007 Otis Dudley Duncan Book Award, Population Section, American Sociological Association.

== Bibliography ==
Fischer has published the following books.

- Made in America: A Social History of American Culture and Character (2010) ISBN 978-0-226-25143-1
- Century of Difference: How America Changed in the Last One Hundred Years. (with Hout). New York: Russell Sage. (2006)
- Inequality by Design: Cracking the Bell Curve Myth, (with Hout, Lucas, Sánchez-Jankowski, Swidler and Voss), Princeton, NJ: Princeton University Press (1996)
- America Calling: A Social History of the Telephone to 1940, University of California Press. (1992)
- The Urban Experience. Second edition. San Diego: Harcourt Brace Jovanovich. (1984)
- To Dwell Among Friends: Personal Networks in Town and City. University of Chicago. (1982)
- Networks and Places: Social Relations in the Urban Setting. (with Jackson, Stueve, Gerson, Jones, and Baldassare). New York: Free Press. (1977)
- Human Aggression and Conflict. (with Scherer and Abeles), Englewood Cliffs, N.J.: Prentice Hall. (1975)
