= Ulric Neisser =

German-American psychologist (1928–2012)

- Born: Ulrich Richard Gustav Neisser; December 8, 1928; Kiel, Schleswig-Holstein, Germany
- Died: February 17, 2012 (aged 83); Ithaca, New York, U.S.
- Education: Harvard University
- Scientific career
- Fields: Psychology
- Workplaces: Cornell University
- Thesis: A methodological study of the quantal hypathesis in auditory psychophysics (1956)

Ulric Richard Gustav Neisser (December 8, 1928 – February 17, 2012) was a German-American psychologist, Cornell University professor, and member of the US National Academy of Sciences. He has been referred to as the "father of cognitive psychology". Neisser researched and wrote about perception and memory. He posited that a person's mental processes could be measured and subsequently analyzed.

In 1967, Neisser published Cognitive Psychology, which he later said was considered an attack on behaviorist psychological paradigms. Cognitive Psychology brought Neisser instant fame and recognition in the field of psychology. While Cognitive Psychology was considered unconventional, it was Neisser's Cognition and Reality that contained some of his most controversial ideas. A main theme in Cognition and Reality is Neisser's advocacy for experiments on perception occurring in natural ("ecologically valid") settings. Neisser postulated that memory is, largely, reconstructed and not a snap shot of the moment. Neisser illustrated this during one of his highly publicized studies on people's memories of the Challenger explosion. In his later career, he summed up current research on human intelligence and edited the first major scholarly monograph on the Flynn effect. A Review of General Psychology survey, published in 2002, ranked Neisser as the 32nd most cited psychologist of the 20th century.

== Early life ==
Ulric Gustav Neisser was born in Kiel, Germany, on December 8, 1928. Neisser's father, Hans Neisser, was a distinguished Jewish economist. In 1923 he married Neisser's mother, Charlotte ("Lotte"), who was a lapsed Catholic active in women's movement in Germany and had a degree in sociology. Neisser also had an older sister, Marianne, who was born in 1924. Neisser was a chubby child tagged early on with the nickname with "Der kleine Dickie" ("little Dicky"), later reduced to "Dick". His given name originally had an "h" on the end (Ulrich), but he believed that it was too German and most of his friends could not properly pronounce it, so he eventually dropped the "h".

Neisser's father foresaw Hitler's coming militarism and left Germany for England in 1933, followed a few months later by his family. They sailed to the United States on the ocean liner Hamburg, arriving in New York on September 15, 1933.

As he grew, Neisser sought to fit in and succeed in America. He took a particular interest in baseball, which is thought to have played an "indirect but important role in [his] psychological interests". Neisser's attraction to baseball alerted him to an idea that he would later call a "flashbulb memory".

== Education ==
Neisser attended Harvard University in the late 1940s, graduating in 1950 with a summa cum laude in psychology. He subsequently entered the master's program at Swarthmore College. Neisser wanted to attend Swarthmore College because that was where Wolfgang Kohler, one of the founders of Gestalt psychology, was a faculty member. Neisser has said that he had always been sympathetic to underdogs, due to boyhood experiences such as being picked last for a baseball team, and that this might have drawn him to Gestalt psychology, which was an underdog school of psychology at the time.

At Swarthmore, instead of working with Wolfgang Kohler, Neisser ended up working with Kohler's less well-known colleague, Hans Wallach. Neisser also met and became friends with a new assistant professor, Henry Gleitman, who later became well known in his own right. Neisser completed his master's degree at Swarthmore in 1952. Neisser went on to obtain a doctorate in experimental psychology from Harvard's Department of Social Relations in 1956, completing a dissertation in the sub-field of psychophysics. He subsequently spent a year as an instructor at Harvard, moving on to Brandeis University, where his intellectual horizon was expanded through contact with department chair Abraham Maslow. According to Cutting, Neisser felt a "deep sympathy for the idealistic humanism" of Abraham Maslow, and Maslow had also been deeply interested in Gestalt psychology. After a time at Emory University and the University of Pennsylvania, Neiser finally established himself at Cornell, where he spent the remainder of his academic career.

While at Harvard Neisser became friends with Oliver Selfridge, a young computer scientist at MIT's Lincoln Laboratories. Selfridge had been an early advocate of machine intelligence, and Neisser served as a part-time consultant in Selfridge's lab. Selfridge and Neisser invented the "pandemonium model of pattern recognition, which they described in a Scientific American article in 1950." After working with Selfridge, Neisser received multiple grants for research involving thinking, which contributed ultimately to his best-known book "Cognitive Psychology".

== Work and career ==
The rapidly developing field of cognitive psychology received a major boost from the publication in 1967 of the first, and most influential, of Neisser's books: Cognitive Psychology. However, over the next decade Neisser developed qualms about where cognitive psychology was headed. In 1976, Neisser wrote Cognition and Reality, in which he expressed three general criticisms of the field. First, he was dissatisfied with the over-emphasis on the specialized information processing models used by cognitive psychologists to describe and explain behavior. Second, he felt that cognitive psychology had failed to address the everyday aspects and functions of human behavior. He placed blame for this failure largely on the excessive reliance on the artificial laboratory tasks that had become endemic to cognitive psychology by the mid-1970s. He felt that cognitive psychology suffered a severe disconnect between theories of behavior tested by laboratory experimentation, on the one hand, and real-world behavior, on the other, a disconnect which he called a lack of ecological validity. Lastly, and perhaps most importantly, he had come to feel a great respect for the theory of direct perception and information pickup that had been proposed by the eminent perceptual psychologist J. J. Gibson and his wife, the "grande dame" of developmental psychology, Eleanor Gibson. Neisser had come to the conclusion that cognitive psychology had little hope of achieving its potential without taking careful note of the Gibsons' view that human behavior may only be understood by starting with an analysis of the information directly available to any perceiving organism.

Another milestone in Neisser's career occurred with his publication, in 1981, of John Dean's memory: a case study, an analysis of John Dean's Watergate scandal testimony. This report introduced his seminal views on memory, discussed elsewhere in this article, particularly the view that a person's memory for an event results from an active process of construction that may be influenced by a combination of events and emotional states, rather than a passive reproduction. This view has obvious implications for the reliability of such things as eye-witness testimony, and Neisser later became a board member of the False Memory Syndrome Foundation.

In 1983, he became a professor at Emory University and founded the Emory Cognition Project, which was later directed by Robyn Fivush. His well-known Challenger study was conducted while he was at Emory.

In 1995, he headed an American Psychological Association task force that reviewed controversial issues in the study of intelligence, in response particularly to then controversial book The Bell Curve. The task force produced a consensus report "Intelligence: Knowns and Unknowns". In April 1996, Neisser chaired a conference at Emory University that focused on secular changes in intelligence-test scores. In 1998, he published The Rising Curve: Long-Term Gains in IQ and Related Measures.

Neisser was both a Guggenheim and Sloan Fellow.

== Research on memory ==
Neisser was an early exponent of one of the key conceptualizations of memory, namely, the view, now widely accepted, that memory represents an active process of construction rather than a passive reproduction of the past. This notion arose from Neisser's analysis of the Watergate testimony of John Dean, a former advisor to Richard Nixon. The study compares Dean's memories, gleaned from his direct testimony, to recorded conversations in which Dean participated. Neisser found that Dean's memories were largely incorrect when compared to the recorded conversations. For one thing, he found that Dean's memories tended to be egocentric, selecting items that emphasized his role in ongoing events. More importantly, Dean combined into single "memories" a combination of events that actually occurred at different times. As Neisser states, "what seems to be a remembered episode actually represents a repeated series of events". Neisser suggested that such memory errors are common, reflecting the nature of memory as a process of construction.

=== Flashbulb memories ===
The concept of flashbulb memories was first described by Brown and Kulik in their 1977 paper on memories of John F. Kennedy's assassination. Thus, a very surprising striking and significant event that induces high emotional arousal may yield a vivid, accurate memory of the time, place and other circumstances ongoing at the time of learning of the event. Neisser sought to analyse this conception of memory by undertaking a study of individual's memories of the Challenger Space Shuttle explosion. Immediately following the Challenger explosion in January 1986, Neisser distributed a questionnaire to college freshmen asking them to write down key information as to where they were, who they were with, and what time it was, when the Challenger explosion occurred. Three years later, Neisser surveyed the now senior students using the same survey to examine the accuracy of their memory. Neisser found that there were notable errors in the student memories, despite the student's confidence in their accuracy. Neisser's findings challenged the idea that flashbulb memories are virtually without error.

Neisser conducted further research on flashbulb memories, aiming to clarify the manner in which memories are constructed. One study involved individuals' recollections of the 1989 California earthquake. Using subjects in California, near the quake, and others in Atlanta, far from it, Neisser examined differences in the recollections of those who actually experienced the event and those who simply heard about it. Neisser used surveys to collect data on the emotional impact of the earthquake and on individual memories of the earthquake to study possible associations between memory and emotion. In the spring of 1991, Neisser contacted participants to compare their current accounts of the earthquake with their previous accounts. He found that, in comparison to participants in Atlanta, the California students generally had more accurate recollections of the earthquake.

== Death ==
Neisser died due to Parkinson's disease on February 17, 2012, in Ithaca, New York.

== Publications ==
=== Books and book chapters ===
- Neisser, U. (1967). Cognitive psychology. Englewood Cliffs: Prentice-Hall. ISBN 978-0131396678
- Neisser, U. (1976). Cognition and reality: Principles and implications of cognitive psychology. New York: Freeman. ISBN 978-0716704775
- Neisser, U. (Ed.) (1982). Memory observed: Remembering in natural contexts. New York: Worth Publishers. ISBN 978-0716733195
- Neisser, U. (Ed.) (1987). Concepts and conceptual development: Ecological and intellectual factors in categorization (Emory Symposia in Cognition 1) New York, NY US: Cambridge University Press. ISBN 978-0521378758
- Neisser, U., & Winograd, E. (Eds.). (1988). Remembering Reconsidered: Ecological and Traditional Approaches to the Study of Memory (Emory Symposia in Cognition 2) Cambridge University Press. ISBN 978-0618967612
- Neisser, U., & Harsch, N. (1992). Phantom flashbulbs: False recollections of hearing the news about Challenger. In E. Winograd, U. Neisser (Eds.), Affect and accuracy in recall: Studies of 'flashbulb' memories (Emory Symposia in Cognition 4) (pp. 9–31). New York, NY US: Cambridge University Press. ISBN 978-0521401883
- Neisser, U. (Ed.) (1993). The Perceived self: Ecological and interpersonal sources of self-knowledge (Emory Symposia in Cognition 5). Cambridge England: Cambridge University Press. ISBN 978-0521415095
- Neisser, U., & Fivush, R. (Eds.) (1994). The remembering self: Construction and accuracy in the self-narrative (Emory Symposia in Cognition 6). Cambridge: Cambridge University Press. ISBN 9780521431941
- Neisser, U., & Jopling, D. A. (Eds.) (1997). The conceptual self in context: Culture, experience, self-understanding (Emory Symposia in Cognition 7) New York, NY US: Cambridge University Press. ISBN 978-0521153607
- Neisser, U. (Ed.) (1998). The rising curve: Long-term gains in IQ and related measures. Washington, DC: American Psychological Association. ISBN 978-1557985033
- Neisser, U. (2003). Cognitive psychology. In, The history of psychology: Fundamental questions (pp. 447–466). New York, NY US: Oxford University Press. ISBN 978-0195151541
- Neisser, U., & Winograd, E. (2006). Remembering reconsidered: Ecological and traditional approaches to the study of memory. Cambridge: Cambridge Univ. Press. ISBN 978-0521485005
- Neisser, U. (2007). Ulric Neisser. In G. Lindzey, W. M. Runyan (Eds.), A history of psychology in autobiography, Vol. IX (pp. 269–301). Washington, DC US: American Psychological Association. ISBN 978-1591477969

=== Journal articles ===
- Neisser, U (1985). "The role of theory in the ecological study of memory: Comment on Bruce". Journal of Experimental Psychology: General. 114 (2): 272–276. doi:10.1037/0096-3445.114.2.272.
- Neisser, U (1991). "Two perceptually given aspects of the self and their development". Developmental Review. 11 (3): 197–209. doi:10.1016/0273-2297(91)90009-D.
- Neisser, U (1994). "Multiple systems: A new approach to cognitive theory". European Journal of Cognitive Psychology. 6 (3): 225–241. doi:10.1080/09541449408520146.
- Neisser, U (1994). "Self-perception and self-knowledge". Psyke & Logos. 15 (2): 392–407.
- Neisser, U.; Boodoo, G.; Bouchard; Boykin, A.; Brody, N.; Ceci, S. J.; Urbina, S. (1996). "Intelligence: Knowns and unknowns". American Psychologist. 51 (2): 77–101. doi:10.1037/0003-066X.51.2.77.
- Neisser, U.; Winograd, E.; Bergman, E. T.; Schreiber, C. A.; Palmer, S. E.; Weldon, M. (1996). "Remembering the Earthquake: Direct Experience vs. Hearing the News". Memory. 4 (4): 337–357. doi:10.1080/096582196388898. PMID 8817459.
- Neisser, U (2003). "New Directions for Flashbulb Memories: Comments on the ACP Special Issue". Applied Cognitive Psychology. 17 (9): 1149–1155. doi:10.1002/acp.1005.
- Neisser, U (2004). "Memory development: New questions and old". Developmental Review. 24 (1): 154–158. doi:10.1016/j.dr.2003.09.002. S2CID 143726342.
