= A. James Gregor =

American political scientist (1929–2019)

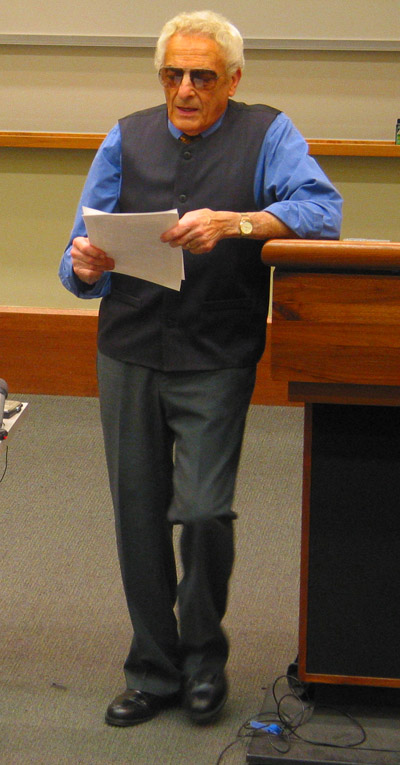
- Gregor lecturing at UC Berkeley in 2004
- Born: April 2, 1929; New York City, U.S.
- Died: August 30, 2019 (aged 90); Redwood City, California
- Education: Columbia University, B.A., PhD
- Awards: Order of Merit of the Italian Republic; Guggenheim Fellowship (1973)
- Scientific career
- Fields: Fascism; Marxism; Political science Race relations and Eugenics; Epistemology
- Workplaces: University of California, Berkeley; Marine Corps University; University of Texas; University of Hawaiʻi

Anthony James Gregor (April 2, 1929 – August 30, 2019) was an American political scientist and eugenicist and professor of political science at the University of California, Berkeley, known for his research on fascism, Marxism, and national security.

== Early life ==
He was born Anthony Gimigliano in New York City. His father, Antonio, was a machine operator, factory worker and a nonpolitical anarchist. Gregor served as a volunteer in the U.S. Army. He attended and graduated in 1952 from Columbia University and thereafter served as a high school social science teacher while working for his advanced degrees.

Prior to founding the International Association for the Advancement of Ethnology and Eugenics, he published several articles on race science and syndicalism for Oswald Mosley's The European and Corrado Gini’s Genus. Gregor's first article in the latter was a defense of Gini's theories, and the two subsequently became friends and collaborators until Gini's death in 1965.

== Eugenics and philosophy ==
In 1959, Gregor joined with Robert E. Kuttner to found the International Association for the Advancement of Ethnology and Eugenics (IAAEE), where Gregor acted as secretary. According to Gregor, the organization was founded to restore "an intellectual climate in the U.S., and throughout the Western World, which would permit a free and open discussion of racial ... problems." The organization was funded by segregationist Wickliffe Draper to oppose the civil rights movement. As part of this group, Gregor was also an assistant editor of, and contributor to, Mankind Quarterly, the organization's journal.

During this period he undertook anthropological field studies of aboriginal people in Central Australia, and similar studies in South Africa and in the southern United States. In 1960, he obtained employment as a philosophy instructor at Washington College, and in 1961 he received his doctorate at Columbia as an Irwin Edman Scholar and with Distinction in History after his dissertation on Giovanni Gentile. Gregor became assistant professor of philosophy at the University of Hawaii from 1961 to 1964. He became an associate professor of philosophy at the universities of Kentucky and Texas between 1964 and 1967. Gregor joined the Political Science Department at the University of California at Berkeley in 1967 where he remained until his retirement.

== Study of fascism ==
Gregor was part of a movement of scholars in the 1960s who rejected the traditional interpretation of fascism as an ideologically empty, reactionary, antimodern dead end. He claimed Italian fascism owed a major debt to European ideological currents in sociology and political theory. Gregor described fascism as a coherent and serious theory of state and society, and argued that it played a revolutionary and modernizing role in European history. His theory of generic fascism portrayed it as a form of "developmental dictatorship." Since the 1970s, Gregor spent most of his academic research on the study of fascism and it is for this that he is best known. In 1969, he published The Ideology of Fascism: The Rationale of Totalitarianism; in 1974, he wrote The Fascist Persuasion in Radical Politics. Since then he published other works on the subject, such as Mussolini's Intellectuals, The Search for Neofascism, and Marxism, Fascism, and Totalitarianism.

Gregor argued that scholars do not agree on the definition of fascism, stating in 1997 that "Almost every specialist has his own interpretation." He argued that Marxist movements of the 20th century discarded Marx and Engels and instead adopted theoretical categories and political methods much like those of Mussolini. In The Faces of Janus (2000) Gregor asserted that the original "Fascists were almost all Marxists—serious theorists who had long been identified with Italy's intelligentsia of the Left." In Young Mussolini (1979), Gregor describes Fascism as "a variant of classical Marxism." According to Gregor, many revolutionary movements have assumed features of paradigmatic Fascism, but none are its duplicate. He said that post-Maoist China displays many of its traits. He denied that paradigmatic fascism can be responsibly identified as a form of right-wing extremism.

Sean Kennedy in Canadian Journal of History said in 2013, "Over a long and distinguished career A. James Gregor has advanced some controversial interpretations of political ideologies. In particular, he holds that the Italian fascist regime is best understood as a "developmental dictatorship," distinct from Nazism in key ways; a thesis that has proven surprisingly influential since 1945." According to Roger Griffin, Gregor wrote an influential early comprehensive survey of existing theoretical models of fascism. Per Andreas Umland writing for The American Historical Review in 2013, "A. James Gregor has, for half a century, been one of the major makers and shapers of the discipline of comparative fascism."

== International relations ==
Gregor said that he was committed to the American form of democratic liberalism, as he said that is the most effective system of government and the most likely to endure. In the 1960s, Gregor held numerous workshops and lectures to convince policymakers and academics to be supportive of the US role in the Vietnam War.

During the 1970s and 1980s Gregor served as an uncompensated adviser to Filipino dictator Ferdinand Marcos, who flew him to Honolulu as part of a "counter-propaganda program", where he argued that the US should withhold support from Marcos's democratic opposition over the latter's opposition to US military bases, while downplaying allegations of human rights abuses as "undocumented or purely hearsay". Gregor furnished names of "other conservative academicians" who would be useful for similar work, which were forwarded to the Minister of Foreign Affairs.

His 1986 book, The China Connection: U.S. Policy and the People's Republic of China and his 1987 follow-up, Arming the Dragon: U.S. Security Ties with the People's Republic of China, discussed Sino-American relations. In 1989 he wrote In the Shadow of Giants: The Major Powers and the Security of Southeast Asia. Gregor was named to the Oppenheimer Chair of Warfighting Strategy 1996–1997 at the Marine Corps University in Quantico, Virginia.

Gregor translated some of the works of Italian fascist philosopher Giovanni Gentile into English, together with a commentary on Gentile's political thought. Until his retirement in 2009, he taught a series of political science courses on revolutionary change, Marxism, and fascism at University of California, Berkeley. In 2014, Gregor published Marxism and the Making of China. In 2016, his work, "Reflections on Italian Fascism" was published in an English and Italian edition. His final project was an analytic study of the transformative revolution that shaped the twentieth century. In 2014, Princeton University Press incorporated his volumes, Italian Fascism and Developmental Dictatorship, and The Fascist Persuasion in Radical Politics, among the books in their "Princeton Legacy Library."

== Academic achievements ==
Gregor was made a national Guggenheim Fellow; a Senior Fellow of the Institute for Advanced Social Studies at the Hebrew University of Jerusalem; H. L Oppenheimer Professor at the Marine Corps University, Quantico, Virginia; and a Knight of the Order of Merit of the Italian Republic.

== Books ==
- A Survey of Marxism: Problems in Philosophy and the Theory of History, New York : Random House, 1965
- Contemporary Radical Ideologies: Totalitarian Thought in the Twentieth Century, New York: Random House, 1969
- The Ideology of Fascism: the rationale of totalitarianism, New York: Free Press, 1969. "L'Ideologia del fascismo", Rome: Edizioni del Borghese, 1974; reprint "L'Ideologia del fascismo: Il fondamento razionale del totalitarismo," Rome: Lulu, 2013.
- An Introduction to Metapolitics: A Brief Inquiry into the Conceptual Language of Political Science. New York: Free Press, 1971; reprinted as "Metascience and Politics: An Inquiry into the Conceptual Language of Political Science" With a new preface and postscript by the author. New Brunswick: Transaction, 2003.
- The Fascist Persuasion in Radical Politics, Princeton, New Jersey.: Princeton University Press, 1974
- Interpretations of Fascism, Morristown: General Learning, 1974; Revised reprint New Brunswick: Transaction, 2000, with a new introduction by the author; "Il Fascismo: Interpretazioni e giudizi" Rome: Antonio Pellicani Editore, 1997, and a third edition, published Florence: LoGisma, 2016.
- "Sergio Panunzio: Il sindacalismo ed il fondamento razionale del fascismo," Rome: Volpe, 1978, New, enlarged edition, Rome: Lulu, 2014.
- "Roberto Michels e l'ideologia del fascismo," Rome: Volpe, 1979, reprint, Rome: Lulu, 2015.
- Young Mussolini and the intellectual origins of Fascism, Berkeley: University of California Press, 1979.
- Italian Fascism and Developmental Dictatorship, Princeton, New Jersey: Princeton University Press, 1979. Reprinted in the Princeton Legacy Library in 2014.
- "The Taiwan Relations Act and the Defense of the Republic of China", Berkeley: Institute of International Studies, 1980.
- Ideology and development: Sun Yat-sen and the Economic History of Taiwan, with Maria Hsia Chang and Andrew B. Zimmerman, China research monographs, Center for Chinese Studies, University of California, Berkeley, number 23, 1981.
- "Essays on U.S.-Philippine Relations," Editor. Washington, D.C.: Heritage Foundation, 1983.
- "The Iron Triangle: A U.S. Security Policy for Northeast Asia," Stanford: Hoover Institution Press, 1984.
- "The Philippine Bases: U.S. Security at Risk", Washington D.C.: Ethics and Public Pollcy, 1987.
- The China Connection: U.S. policy and the People's Republic of China, 1986.
- Arming the Dragon: U.S. Security Ties with the People's Republic of China, 1987.
- In the Shadow of Giants: the Major Powers and the Security of Southeast Asia, 1989.
- "Land of the Morning Calm: U.S. Interests and the Korean Peninsula", Washington, D.C.: Ethics and Public Policy, 1989
- Marxism, China, & Development: Reflections on Theory and Reality, New Brunswick, New Jersey: Transaction Publisher, 1995
- Phoenix: Fascism in Our Time. New Brunswick: Transaction, 1999.
- The Faces of Janus: Marxism and Fascism in the Twentieth Century. New Haven, Connecticut: Yale University Press, 2000. Spanish edition, "Los Rostros de Jano: Marxismo y Fascismo en el siglo XX", Universitat de Valencia, 2002.
- Giovanni Gentile: philosopher of fascism, New Brunswick, New Jersey: Transaction Publishers, 2001; Italian edition, "Giovanni Gentile: Il filosofo del fascismo", Lecce: Pensa, 2014.
- A Place in the Sun: Marxism and Fascism in China's Long Revolution, Westview Press, 2000
- Translation from the Italian: Origins and Doctrine of Fascism: Giovanni Gentile, Transaction Publishers, 2nd ed. 2004
- The Search for Neofascism, Cambridge University Press, 2006.
- Mussolini's Intellectuals: Fascist Social and Political Thought, Princeton University Press, new ed. 2006
- Marxism, Fascism, and Totalitarianism: Chapters in the Intellectual History of Radicalism, Stanford University Press, 2008.
- Totalitarianism and Political Religion: An Intellectual History, Stanford University Press, 2012. Czech edition,"Totalitarismus a politickḕ náboženstvi" Brno: Center for the Study of Democracy and Culture, 2015
- Marxism and the Making of China: A Doctrinal History, Palgrave-Macmillan, 2014
- Reflections on Italian Fascism: An Interview with Antonio Messina, Berlin: Logos Verlag, 2015; Italian edition, Riflessioni sul fascismo italiano, Firenze: Apice Libri, 2016.
