= Neue Anthropologie =

- Discipline: Anthropology
- Language: German
- Edited by: Jürgen Rieger

Publication details
- History: 1973-unknown
- Publisher: Society for Biological Anthropology, Eugenics and Behavioural Science
- Frequency: Quarterly

Standard abbreviations
- ISO 4: Neue Anthropol.

Indexing
- ISSN: 0344-3124
- OCLC no.: 223441501

Neue Anthropologie was a quarterly anthropology journal. It was published in Hamburg, West Germany by the Society for Biological Anthropology, Eugenics and Behavioural Science, whose chairman, Jürgen Rieger, was also the journal's editor. It served as a platform for neo-Nazi psychological and anthropological pseudoscience, with a particular focus on scientific racism.

== History ==
Neue Anthropologie was established in 1973. It followed several similar journals published by the Society for Biological Anthropology, Eugenics and Behavioural Science, the first of which, Erbe und Verantwortung, was established in 1964. The journal's first issue contained a tribute to Fritz Lenz, as well as an interview with Arthur Jensen that had previously been published in Nouvelle École. Jensen went on to contribute articles for the journal on a regular basis. In 1976, Neue Anthropologie published a bibliography of Jensen's work from 1967 until then; Jensen joined the journal's "board of scientific advisers" two years later. Other board members included Donald A. Swan, an anthropologist and Mankind Quarterly editor who had received grants from the Pioneer Fund, and Alain de Benoist, who also wrote for the journal under the pseudonym Fabrice Laroche.

== Content ==
Neue Anthropologie published content supporting eugenics and scientific racism. This included articles focusing on race and intelligence, as well as polemics attacking "race-mixing". According to Michael Billig, the content published in Neue Anthropologie "...is racist and it is preserving the racial philosophy of Nazi theorist Hans Günther."

In 1978–79, they referred to a need to sterilize those like alcoholics, "who are often Haltlose psychopaths", from bearing children, to reduce crime.

== Links to neo-Nazism and fascism ==
The editor of Neue Anthropologie, Jürgen Rieger, was a prominent German fascist and member of the Northern League. Several other members of the journal's advisory board also had connections to neo-fascism and neo-Nazism, including Rolf Kosiek, Hans Georg Amsel, and F.J. Irsigler. Ian Barnes noted that the journal's "...editorial board has links with The Northlander and one member belongs to the neo-Nazi Nationaldemokratische Partei Deutschlands (NPD) while others write for the neo-Nazi newspapers Deutsche Wochen-Zeitung and Deutsche Hochschullehrer Zeitung."

== Connections to Mankind Quarterly ==
Neue Anthropologie was closely associated with Mankind Quarterly, of which it has been described as a sister journal. The two publications sometimes carried advertisements for each other, and published papers by many of the same authors, including some of the same articles. The close similarity and connections between the two journals has also led to Neue Anthropologie being described as one of two European "clones of Mankind Quarterly" to emerge in the late 1960s and early 1970s (the other being Nouvelle École).
