= Roger Pearson (anthropologist) =

British anthropologist and far-right activist (born 1927)

- Portrait of Pearson whilst an officer in the British Indian Army, 1946
- Born: 1927 (age 98–99); London, England
- Occupation: Physical anthropologist
- Political party: Northern League
- Other political affiliations: WLFD; Pioneer Fund
- Movement: Neo-Nazism

Roger Pearson (born 1927) is a British physical anthropologist, eugenicist, white supremacist, political organiser for the extreme right and publisher of political and academic journals.

Pearson was a part of the faculty of the Queens University of Charlotte, the University of Southern Mississippi, and Montana Tech, before his retirement. It has been noted that Pearson was surprisingly successful in combining a career in academia with political activities on the far right.

Pearson served in the British Army after World War II, and was a businessman in South Asia. In the late 1950s, he founded the Northern League. In the 1960s, he established himself in the United States for a while working together with Willis Carto publishing white supremacist and antisemitic literature. He was a member of The Heritage Foundation's editorial board.

Pearson's anthropological work was based in the eugenic belief that "favourable" genes can be identified and segregated from "unfavourable" ones. He advocated a belief in biological racialism, and claimed that human races can be ranked. Pearson argues that the future of the human species depends on political and scientific steps to replace the "genetic formulae" and populations that he considers to be inferior with ones he considers to be superior.

Pearson was still alive as of May 2019.

== Early life ==
Roger Pearson was born in London in 1927. Pearson's only sibling and four of his cousins died in World War II. Pearson later described World War II as a "fratricidal war" in which the mutual destruction of Germanic peoples contributed to the gradual downfall of the Nordic race.

Pearson joined the British Army's Queen's Royal Regiment in April 1945 in England, and was commissioned in 1946 from the British Indian Army's Officers Training School Kakul, North-West Frontier Province, which is now the Pakistan Military Academy. He served with the British Indian Army in Meerut in 1946 before the Partition of India, with the British Indian Division in the Occupation of Japan, and with the British Army in Singapore in 1948, before returning to university in England. Pearson later directed various British-controlled companies in East Pakistan, which is present-day Bangladesh.

== Academic career ==
In 1967, Pearson began teaching anthropology as an assistant professor at the University of Southern Mississippi (USM). In 1969 he received a Ph.D. in anthropology from the University of London. In 1971, USM granted Pearson full professorship and appointed him chair of the department of anthropology and sociology. Three years later, Pearson left USM and taught at the Montana College of Mineral Science and Technology for one year. After resigning from that school, Pearson founded the Institute for the Study of Man.

=== Anthropological views ===
Pearson's anthropological views drew on the theories of British anthropologist Arthur Keith, who had argued that human races were distinct evolutionary units destined to compete for resources. Pearson's early writings directly cited Keith as a major influence even while recognizing that "many will see [Keith's observations] as a defence of Hitlerite philosophy." Pearson summarizes Keith's racial and evolutionary philosophy in the following manner: "If a nation with a more advanced, more specialised, or in any way superior set of genes mingles with, instead of exterminating, an inferior tribe, then it commits racial suicide, and destroys the work of thousands of years of biological isolation and natural selection."

In his work, Pearson described racial types as subspecies, which he defined as "a distinctive group of individuals which are on their way to becoming separate species, but which have not been isolated long enough, or had time to become sufficiently diversified to lose the power to inter-breed". He argued that mixing between subspecies is detrimental as one subspecies will always be better suited for life than the other, and will therefore tend to avoid miscegenation.

In 1995 and 1996, Pearson published a trilogy of articles in Mankind Quarterly regarding the "Concept of heredity in Western thought", a defense of hereditarianism and a denouncement of the "onslaught of egalitarianism". Pearson here repeated his defense for the view of racial groups as subspecies and he repeated his dedication to eugenicist ideas, although with the caveat that negative eugenics ought to take place as a voluntary act of altruistic sacrifice for one's species. The same views were repeated in the 1996 book Heredity and Humanity: Race, Eugenics and Modern Science.

== Business in South Asia ==
Pearson served as president of the Pakistan Tea Association, Chittagong, in 1963. He also served on the managing committee of the Federation of Pakistan Chambers of Commerce and Industry. Pearson sold his business interests in East Pakistan in 1965 and moved to the United States. It was during his time in South Asia that he became interested in Aryanism, and the linguistic, cultural, and genetic connections between Northern Europe and the Indo-Aryan populations of the Subcontinent.

== Academic career in the U.S. ==
Recently arrived in the United States, Pearson contributed to some of the publications of anti-Semite Willis Carto, such as Western Destiny. From 1966 to 1967 as "Stephan Langton", Pearson published The New Patriot, a magazine devoted to "a responsible but penetrating inquiry into every aspect of the Jewish Question." As Lanton he published articles such as "Zionists and the Plot Against South Africa," "Early Jews and the Rise of Jewish Money Power" and "Swindlers of the Crematoria." His books of this era, all published in 1966 in London by Clair Press, including Eugenics and Race, Blood groups and Race, Race & Civilisation and Early Civilizations of the Nordic Peoples were later distributed in the United States by The Thunderbolt Inc., an organ of the National States' Rights Party. Pearson's co-founder of The New Patriot was Senator Jack Tenney, who for sixteen years was Chairman of the California Senate Committee on Un-American Activities and who wrote frequently for that journal. Pearson joined the Eugenics Society in 1963 and became a fellow in 1977.

In 1973, Pearson founded the Journal of Indo-European Studies, and in 1976 he founded Journal of Social, Political and Economic Studies. In 1978 he took over the editorship of the journal Mankind Quarterly, which had originally been founded in 1960 by Robert Gayre, Henry Garrett, Corrado Gini, Ottmar von Verschuer and Reginald Ruggles Gates.

In 1971, he was appointed chair of the department of Anthropology Comparative Religious Studies at the USM. According to William Tucker's description, he fired most of the non-tenured faculty, hiring instead scholars such as Robert E. Kuttner and Donald A. Swan, both with similar political backgrounds to Pearson. The dean at USM later stated that Pearson had "used his post as an academic façade to bring in equal-minded fanatics."

In 1974, Pearson was appointed Professor and Dean of Academic Affairs and Director of Research at Montana Tech. During his tenure as dean, the school received $60,000 from the Pioneer Fund to support Pearson's academic research and publishing activities. When a journalist called the various universities at which Pearson had held positions, Montana Tech officials stated they were unaware that Pearson was the person who had edited Western Destiny, a periodical laden with many pro-South Africa, anti-Communist and anti-racial mixing articles, who had penned both articles and pamphlets for Willis Carto's Noontide Press. These race-oriented titles included: "Eugenics and Race" and "Early Civilizations of the Nordic Peoples."

Pearson's work in publishing the work of "scholars who are supportive of a free enterprise economy, and a firm and consistent foreign policy and a strong national defense" was commended by President Ronald Reagan for his "substantial contribution to promoting and upholding those ideals and principles that we value at home and abroad."

== Political activity ==
In 1958, Pearson founded the Northern League for North European Friendship, an organisation promoting Pan-Germanism, Antisemitism and neo-Nazi racial ideology. The Northern League published the journals "The Northlander" and "Northern World" which described its purpose as "to make Whites aware of their forgotten racial heritage, and cut through the Judaic fog of lies about our origin and the accomplishments of our race and our Western culture." In 1959 in the Northlander, Pearson described the aim of the organization as preventing the "annihilation of our kind" and to lead Nordics in Europe and the Americas in the "fight for survival against forces which would mongrelize our race and civilization". He also wrote of the need for "a totalitarian state, with conscious purpose and central control . . . to embark upon a thorough-going policy of genetic change for its population. . . . [T]here is surely little doubt that it could soon outstrip rival nations."

Pearson also corresponded with American segregationist Earnest Sevier Cox, a dedicated member of the League, who had lobbied for a federal funding to "repatriate" African-Americans to Africa since the 1920s. Pearson assured him that "I am entirely with you on your efforts to obtain Federal aid to American Negroes who wish to return to Africa."

From the beginning, the League was criticized because of its open emphasis on the dysgenic and fratricidal nature of intra-European warfare, and its tendency to attract prominent ex-Nazis such as scholar Hans F. K. Günther, who received awards under the Nazi regime for his work on race, and Heinrich Himmler's former assistant Franz Altheim, both of whom were members of the league in its early years. Other members of the league were British Neo-Nazi Colin Jordan, and John Tyndall. Pearson resigned from the League in 1961, after which it became more politically oriented.

Cox suggested to Pearson that they should hold a meeting at Detmold in West Germany, near what was then believed to be the site where the Germanic tribes defeated the Romans in the Battle of the Teutoburg Forest. The first meeting of the League was indeed held there in 1959, with Cox and Hans F. K. Günther as keynote speakers, although Günther's participation, given that he was a prominent former Nazi, had to be kept low profile. The event was described by locals as akin to Nazism revived.

Pearson also published two popular textbooks in anthropology, but his anthropological views on race have been widely rejected as unsupported by contemporary anthropology. In 1976 he found the Journal of Social, Political and Economic Studies, which has been identified as one of two international journals which regularly publishes articles pertaining to race and intelligence with the goal of supporting the idea that white people are inherently superior (the other such journal being Mankind Quarterly).

In 1978, he took over the editorship of Mankind Quarterly founded by Robert Gayre and Henry Garrett, widely considered a scientific racist journal. Most of Pearson's publishing ventures were managed through the Institute for the Study of Man, and the Pioneer Fund, with which Pearson was closely associated, having received $568,000 in the period from 1981 to 1991.

Pearson's opposition to egalitarianism extended to Marxism and socialism. In the 1980s, he was a political organizer for the American far-right; he established the Council for American Affairs in the 1970s and was the American representative in the World Anti-Communist League during the second half of the 1970s. As world chairman of the WACL, he worked with the U.S. government during the Cold War, and collaborated with many anti-communist groups in the organisation, including the Unification Church and former German Nazis.

=== World Anti-Communist League ===
In 1975, Pearson left academia and moved to Washington, D.C., to become president of the Council on American Affairs, President of the American chapter of the World Anti-Communist League, editor of the Journal on American Affairs, which was later renamed The Journal of Social, Political and Economic Studies, and eventually president of University Professors for Academic Order (UPAO), an organisation advocating academic integrity, social order and that the university should not be "an instrument of social change" and working to depoliticize campus environments. He was also a trustee of the Benjamin Franklin University.

He also served on editorial board of the several institutions, including The Heritage Foundation, the Foreign Policy Research Institute, and the American Security Council, and a number of conservative politicians wrote articles for Pearson's Journal on American Affairs and related monographs, including Senators Jake Garn (R-UT), Carl T. Curtis (R-NE), Jesse Helms (R-NC), and Representatives Jack Kemp (R-NY), and Philip Crane (R-UT).

Pearson was elected world chairman of the World Anti-Communist League in 1978. According to William H. Tucker, he "used this opportunity to fill the WACL with European Nazis – ex-officials of the Third Reich and Nazi collaborators from other countries during the war as well as new adherents to the cause—in what one journalist called 'one of the greatest fascist blocs in postwar Europe'."

Pearson presided over the League's 11th Annual Conference held in Washington that year. The initial session of the five-day session, which was addressed by two U.S. Senators and opened by the United States Marine Corps Band and Joint Armed Services Honor Guard, was attended by several hundred members from around the world. After the meeting had been condemned in Pravda, The Washington Post published an even more critical attack on both WACL and Pearson's extreme right wing politics.

Pearson resigned from the WACL in the wake of accusations that he "encouraged the membership of European and Latin American groups with Nazi or neo-Nazi ties". In a Wall Street Journal article subsequent chairman John Singlaub was quoted calling Pearson an "embarrassment" who is "not at all welcome in any activity". The same article claimed that Pearson's presidential commendation had been achieved only through the mediation of an associate of Pearson's who worked in the Defense Department. The White House did not retract the letter, but made a public statement in which the Presidential secretary affirmed the Presidents' repudiation of any sort of racial discrimination. Pearson was requested to stop using the letter from Reagan in public promotion of his activities. One member of the WACL, conservative politician Geoffrey Stewart-Smith, described the organization during its period under Pearson as "largely a collection of Nazis, Fascists, anti-Semites, sellers of forgeries, vicious racialists, and corrupt self-seekers."

After The Washington Post article, Pearson was asked to resign from the editorial board of the neoconservative Heritage Foundation journal Policy Review, which he helped found, but his connection with other organisations continued. In 1986, CovertAction Quarterly uncovered his association with James Jesus Angleton, former chief of CIA Counter-Intelligence, General Daniel O. Graham, former director of the Defense Intelligence Agency, General Robert C. Richardson, and other American Security Council members.

=== Association with the Pioneer Fund ===
In 1981, Pearson received the library of Donald A. Swan through a grant from the Pioneer Fund. Between 1973 and 1999 the Fund spent $1.2 million on Pearson's activities, most of which was used for the Institute for the Study of Man which Pearson directed and which under Pearson acquired the peer-reviewed journal Mankind Quarterly in 1979. Pearson took over as publisher and is said to have editorial influence, although his name has never appeared on the masthead. Pearson has used diverse pseudonyms to contribute to the journal, including "J. W. Jamieson" and "Alan McGregor", sometimes even using one pseudonym to review and praise the work of another. This publication was later taken over by The Council for Social and Economic Studies.

Pearson was also director of the Council for Social and Economics Studies, which owns the Scott-Townsend Publishers imprint (which published most of his later books), and General Editor of the Journal of Social, Political, and Economic Studies.

== Publications ==
- Eastern Interlude. Thacker Spink, Calcutta; Luzac and Co., London (1953)
- This is a Republic, Not a Democracy! Let's Keep It That Way. Los Angeles: Noontide Press (1965)

Published under the pseudonym "Edward Langford."

- Eugenics and Race. London: Clair Press; Los Angeles: Noontide Press (1958) OCLC 9737954.
- Blood Groups and Race. 2nd ed. London: Clair Press; Los Angeles: Noontide Press (1966) OCLC 6099970.
- Race & Civilisation. 2nd Ed. London: Clair Press; Los Angeles: Noontide Press (1966) OCLC 4387181.
- Early Civilizations of the Nordic Peoples. London: Northern World (1958); Los Angeles: Noontide Press (1965) OCLC 9972221.
- Introduction to Anthropology: An Ecological/Evolutionary Approach. New York: Holt Rinehart and Winston (1974)
- Sino-Soviet Intervention in Africa. Council on American Affairs (1977)
- Korea in the World Today. Washington, D.C.: Council on American Affairs (1978)
- Ecology and Evolution. Washington, D.C.: Mankind Quarterly Monograph (1981)
- Essays in Medical Anthropology. Washington, D.C.: Scott-Townsend Publishers (1981)
- Anthropological Glossary. Marla at, FL: Krieger Publishing (1985)
- Evolution, Creative Intelligence, and Intergroup Competition. Cliveden Press (1986)
- Race, Intelligence and Bias in Academe. Introduction by Hans Eysenck. Scott-Townsend Publishers, Washington, D.C., 1991 OCLC 25308868 (2nd. Ed. 1994).
- Heredity and Humanity: Race, Eugenics and Modern Science. Washington, D.C.: Scott-Townsend Publishers (1991) [2nd ed. 1998].
