= Peter Huxley-Blythe =

British author and fascist (1925–2013)

- Born: November 16, 1925; Mansfield, Nottinghamshire, England
- Died: August 18, 2013 (aged 87); Chester, Cheshire, England

Philosophical work
- Notable works: The East Came West

Peter Huxley-Blythe (16 November 1925 – 18 August 2013) was a British author and fascist.

== Early life ==
Huxley-Blythe was born in Mansfield, Nottinghamshire, the son of Annie Huxley and Henry Blythe. His father was a self-proclaimed "consultant hypnotist" who often worked as a stage hypnotist in the music halls and once ran as a candidate for the Labour Party under the slogan "Look into my Eyes and Vote for Me". Shortly after his birth, his family moved to London. His parents' marriage broke up when he was young and he was brought up by his mother. He attended Chapel Royal Hampton Court and the St Mary of the Angels school, where he specialised in choir singing. As a teenager, he was strongly attracted to the British Union of Fascists movement led by Sir Oswald Mosley. He attended the Royal Naval College at Dartmouth and in 1939 he was assigned to the training ship HMS Arethusa. During the Second World War, he served in the Royal Navy in the Atlantic, Mediterranean and Pacific theaters. He went to sea in 1942, and served abroad HMS Renown for two years. He then served on abroad HMS Highflyer, HMS Virago and HMS Rapid.

== Anti-Communism ==
An extreme anti-communist with a hankering for authoritarian leadership, after his honourable discharge from the Navy he joined the Union Movement, Oswald Mosley's successor to the British Union of Fascists, and became close to the American thinker Francis Parker Yockey. When Yockey broke with Mosley, Huxley-Blythe followed the former into the European Liberation Front (ELF). Huxley-Blythe shared Yockey's fears about the "cultural-racial decline" of the West, and like him saw the United States as a "mongrelised" society that was a corrupting influence on the rest of the world. The 12-point plan of the ELF, which was partially written by Huxley-Blythe, called for "the immediate expulsion of all Jews and other parasitic aliens from the Soil of Europe" and the "cleansing of the Soul of Europe from the ethical syphilis of Hollywood". In 1950, having remained an officer with the Royal Naval Reserve, he was called up to service during the Korean War and lost touch with Yockey. During his Korean War service, he got to know a Lieutenant Hillary Cotter, a self-proclaimed "Catholic fascist" who was to influence his thinking. It was through Cotter that Huxley-Blythe first learned of the Russian Liberation Army, better known as the Vlasov Army, which became a subject that was to greatly interest him for the rest of his life. His interest in the Russian Liberation Army was to "change radically his views about Russia".

After his return from Korea, Huxley-Blythe resumed his far-right associations. He claimed he broke with Yockey over what he claimed were Yockey's pro-Soviet views, writing in a letter to the FBI in 1961 that he ceased associating with Yockey when the latter "praised Soviet policy in Germany" and urged his followers "to help him organise secret partisan bands of neo-Nazis in West Germany, bands which would collaborate with the Soviet Military Authorities against the Western occupation powers". On 2 February 1952, Huxley-Blythe wrote to the Canadian fascist Adrien Arcand, asking for permission to publish in German his anti-Semitic pamphlet La Clé du mystère, writing: "I'm anxious to obtain two hundred (200) copies of your excellent work, The Key to the Mystery as soon as possible to fulfill an order I have received from Germany". Permission was granted, and on 27 February 1952 he wrote to Arcand for permission to print up to 300 more copies of La Clé du mystère for sale in Great Britain. During this time, he served as a mentor to Colin Jordan. He served as editor of the ELF's journal Frontfighter and of the Anglo-German Natinform (Nationalist Information Bureau). The Natinform was a joint venture between A. F. X. Baron and Huxley-Blythe, and fell apart when the two quarreled in 1958.

At some point in the 1950s, Huxley-Blythe became friends with a George Knupffer, the self-proclaimed tutor and adviser to the Grand Duke Vladimir, the son of Grand Duke Kirill, the pretender to the Russian throne. Huxley-Blythe became involved in quixotic plans to restore the House of Romanov to the Russian throne. Taking up the quarrels of the Russian emigres as his own, Huxley-Blythe was relentless in attacking the NTS (Nacional'no Trudovoj Sojuz - the National Alliance of Russian Solidarists) as a pro-Soviet group, using the fact that the CIA sometimes financed the NTS as proof that the group was really working for the Soviet Union.

A major interest for Huxley-Blythe was the repatriation of the Cossacks, a subject that he started to research in the 1950s. Huxley-Blythe first came to widespread notice with his 1955 book Betrayal: The Story of Russian Anti-Communism where he argued that the West was losing the Cold War and claimed that CIA was actually supporting communist groups. After the Suez Crisis of 1956, Huxley-Blythe's journalism, as expressed in his newsletter World Survey, started to take an aggressively anti-American tone as he became an obsessive critic of President Dwight Eisenhower, whom he attacked as being "pro-Communist". Huxley-Blythe attracted a following among the elements of American right disenchanted with Eisenhower, who had been elected president in 1952 on a platform calling for the "rollback" of communism, but in office pursued the same "containment" policy as Harry Truman. Knupffer also served as the London correspondent of Task Force, the journal of an American ultra-conservative force, Defenders of the American Constitution (DAC). Through Knupffer, Huxley-Blythe got in touch with the DAC, one of whose leaders, Pedro del Valle, called Betrayal an "excellent work" in a book review, being deeply impressed with Huxley-Blythe's thesis that the CIA was supporting communist groups instead of anti-communist ones. Task Force combined its August and September editions of 1956 in order to reprint Betrayal, calling it "one of the most important articles it has ever been a privilege to publish". Likewise, the American journal Right was impressed with Huxley-Blythe's pamphlet Insecure Security, which claimed that the West was losing the Cold War, and an editorial in 1958 stated that Huxley-Blythe was "no stranger to well informed American patriots." Huxley-Blythe's belief in white supremacy, his attacks on nationalists demanding independence in Britain's African colonies, his opposition to non-white immigration, and his equally vehement opposition to the American civil rights movement, helped to make him a well-known figure to the American far right. In the 1950s, there was a tendency for Anglo-American white supremacists to see themselves as threatened by a common foe, and to link support for segregation in the United States with the struggle to maintain the British Empire in Africa.

In his articles, Huxley-Blythe claimed to be in contact with vast underground armies behind the Iron Curtain, which were ready to rise up the moment that the West started a policy of "rollback". Huxley-Blythe compared the nuclear deterrence policies of the Eisenhower administration to the Maginot Line, demanding that the West undertake an offensive foreign policy to liquidate the Soviet Union once and for all. In 1958, he merged his journal World Survey with Pearson's journal Northlander to better promote "scientific and forward looking nationalism." Together with Roger Pearson he co-founded the Northern League in 1958, whose stated purpose was to protect the "Nordic race" from the "annihilation of our kind" and to struggle "against forces which would mongrelise our race and civilisation." In 1967, the American historian Kurt Tauber described Huxley-Blythe as very active in a number of neo-Nazi groups in both West Germany and the United Kingdom from the late 1940s onward, and as a leading anti-Semitic conspiracy theorist. Within far-right circles in Britain, Huxley-Blythe had the reputation of "a reckless adventurer."

In 1958, he demanded in a public letter to the Prime Minister Harold Macmillan that Britain pay reparations to the survivors of the Cossack repatriation, a request that was refused. Afterwards, Huxley-Blythe drew up a petition which he submitted to Queen Elizabeth II, criticising Macmillan and demanding that Britain pay compensation to the Cossacks. A major theme of Huxley-Blythe's writings was a tendency to equate "Western civilization" with whiteness and Christianity, together with a deep fear of "cosmopolitism" and racial "degeneracy". Huxley-Blythe was obsessed with the theme of maintaining racial purity for the "Nordic race" (defined as white, Christian people originating from north-west Europe) and believed that various phenomena such as non-white immigration to Britain and the civil rights movement in the United States were all part of the same "Communist plot" to destroy the "Nordic race" via miscegenation. Another major theme of the writings of Huxley-Blythe and other writers associated with the Northern League was the basic inequality of humanity, supported by pseudo-scientific studies purporting to prove that non-white people had lower IQs than white people.

In April–May 1961, he covered the trial of Adolf Eichmann in Jerusalem for the anti-Semitic The American Mercury magazine. His coverage was turned into the 2011 book The Eichmann Trial: An Incredible Spectacle by a Protestant fundamentalist minister from Tulsa, Oklahoma, Gerald S. Pope, who served as an editor of the American Mercury. The editorials written by Pope in the American Mercury were strongly anti-Semitic and white supremacist, with the cover story of one issue from 1970 reading "Shall We Die for Israel?" In a 1961 editorial about the civil rights movement Pope declared: "Enlightened Americans are not intimidated by propaganda that says discrimination in any form is wrong. They know that such philosophy is the work of the enemies of freedom who seek to destroy individualism and to create in its place a collectivism that treats man as a faceless member of society." In 1964, Huxley-Blythe turned his pamphlet Betrayal into the book The East Came West, where he accused General Eisenhower and various British leaders such as Winston Churchill of being war criminals for forcibly repatriating Soviet citizens after World War II. He praised what he called "Cossacks' fight for freedom from 1941 until 1945 and from them he learned the method used by the British to betray them. Former members of the Russian Liberation Army and refugees told him of the treatment they had received from U.S. troops who forced them back to the merciless Soviet leaders using rifles and bayonets." Huxley-Blythe was the first writer in English on the subject, and through his writings on the subject were "highly partisan", he sparked interest in the matter. In his best-selling 1977 book Victims of Yalta, Count Nikolai Tolstoy called Huxley-Blythe "my friend" and praised him for his "readable outline of the whole story" in The East Came West.

== Alternative medicine ==
Starting in the 1960s, he started to promote hypnotism as the cure for various illness and began to portray himself as an expert in curing learning disabilities in children. He founded the Blythe College of Hypnotherapy and lectured in both the United Kingdom and Sweden on the alleged medical benefits of hypnotism. He claimed to be awarded a PhD in Psychosomatic Medicine at an unnamed American university. Despite admitting that he "knew nothing" about the subject of learning disabilities in children, he delivered in 1969 a well received lecture on the subject about helping children with reading difficulties, which led him to become interested in the subject. Reflecting his interest in alternative medicine, Huxley-Blythe published in the 1970s several books such as Hypnotism–its power and practice (1971), Stress Disease (1973), Drugless Medicine (1974) and Self Hypnotism—its potential and practice (1976) extolling alternative medicine as preferable to conventional medicine. His health books were published under the name Peter Blythe instead of Peter Huxley-Blythe. In 1975, he published a biography of Nicholas Dulger-Sheikin, a Russo-Greek man who worked as a spy in World War Two under the title The Man Who Was Uncle: The Biography Of A Master Spy.

In 1975, he founded the Institute for Neuro-Physiological Psychology (INPP), based in Chester, England. The INPP was a pseudo-scientific group that hosted speakers such as a Dr. Richard Halvorsen who claimed autism was caused by measles vaccines and a Dr. Ursula Anderson who claimed that stem cells were regenerated by human memories. Huxley-Blythe and others at the INPP claimed that various childhood developmental issues such as Asperger's symptom, Attention Deficit Disorder, and problems with learning math were caused by "neurodevelopmental delay", which was described as the failure of a child's brain to inhibit the motor reflexes seen in infants that are normally switched off as a child ages. The INPP professed to be able to help to overcome "neurodevelopmental delay" for a price. |Discover]] magazine called the INPP a collection of "dubious people" promoting theories with no scientific basis. The same article noted the website for the INPP had had a footnote attached to the statement "Peter Blythe, PhD" reading "The INPP is an apolitical organization. It does not reflect or support any political, cultural, social or religious ideology or the personal views of its members or former members." About this statement, the article noted: "Well, that's good to hear. Because if they did reflect the ideology of their members, let's say, of their founder, then they would be a fascist organization. Quite literally."

In 1979, he published a book with David McGlown An Organic Basis for Neuroses and Educational Difficulties, where he argued that learning disabilities in children were caused by immaturity in the functioning of central nervous system, which could be improved without drugs by his methods. His approach to remediating some learning disabilities was to replicate some of the movements of early childhood to give the brain "a second chance" to re-educate motor pathways in the nervous system to improve coordination, balance, postural control and centres involved in the control of eye movements. The website for the Institute for Neuro-Physiological Psychology claimed that the "INPP Method" of "reconditioning" the body had helped thousands of children with learning disabilities since the 1970s. In 2001, he retired as the director of the INPP, to be succeeded by his wife Sally.

In 2004, he published his last book, Under the St. Andrew's Cross, an admiring account of Russian volunteers who fought for Nazi Germany in World War Two with a foreword by Count Nikolai Tolstoy. In writing Under the St. Andrew's Cross, he was assisted by Antonio J. Muñoz, a Cuban-American amateur historian who specialises in the Eastern Front.

Huxley-Blythe was closely involved in the INPP until a year before his death, and the institute is now headed by his widow Sally. About Sally Blythe, the British psychologist Dorothy V. M. Bishop wrote in 2011:

Mrs Goddard Blythe is entitled to her views. My concern is with the blurring of the distinction between opinion and evidence. When a view about effects of parenting is widely promulgated on national media, and is expressed by someone who is described as a consultant in neurodevelopmental education and Director of an Institute, the natural assumption is made that (a) they are speaking from a position of authority, and (b) they have some hard evidence. In this case, neither appears to be true.

== Publications ==
Books

- Betrayal: The Story of Russian Anti-Communism. London: Friends of National Russia, 1955.
- The East Came West. Caldwell, Idaho: Caxton, 1964.
- Hypnotism: Its Power and Practice. London: Taplinger, 1971. ISBN 0800840453.
- Stress Disease The Glowing Plague. London: Arthur Barker, 1973. ISBN 978-0213164270.
- Drugless Medicine Herbalism, Homopathy, Naturopathy, Osteopathy, Chripopathic. London: Arthur Barker, 1974. ISBN 978-0213164713.
- The Man Who Was Uncle: The Biography of a Master Spy. London: Arthur Barker, 1975. ISBN 0213165325.
- Self-Hypnotism Its Power and Potential. London: Arthur Barker, 1976. ISBN 0213165805.
- An Organic Basis for Neuroses and Educational Difficulties: A new look at the Minimal Brain Dysfunction syndrome, with David Mcglown. Chester: Insight Publications, 1979. ISBN 978-0950670409.
- Under the St. Andrew's Cross: Russian & Cossack Volunteers in World War II, 1941-1945. Bayside, NY: Europa Books, 2004. ISBN 1891227440.
- The Eichmann Trial: An Incredible Spectacle. Whitefish, Montana: Literary Licensing, 2011. ISBN 1258002930.
- Emotions That Kill Feelings That Heal: How Modern Medicine has Divorced the Mind From the Body. Chester: Insight Publication, 2016.

Book contributions

- Foreword. Miracle Children: Behavior and Learning Disabilities, by Anna Buck. Northglenn, Colorado: Anna's House, 2008.

== Notes and references ==
=== Bibliography ===
- Booker, Christopher (1997). A Looking-glass Tragedy: The Controversy Over the Repatriations from Austria in 1945. London: Duckworth. ISBN 0715627384.
- Coogan, Kevin (1999). Dreamer of the Day: Francis Parker Yockey and the Postwar Fascist International. Brooklyn: Autonomedia. ISBN 1570270392.
- Dorril, Stephen (2006). Blackshirt: Sir Oswald Mosley and British Fascism. New York: Viking. ISBN 0670869996.
- Goodrick-Clarke, Nicholas (2002). Black Sun: Aryan Cults, Esoteric Nazism, and the Politics of Identity. New York University Press. ISBN 978-0-8147-3124-6.
- Farber, Paul Lawrence; Cravens, Hamilton (2009). Race and Science: Scientific Challenges to Racism in Modern America. Portland: Oregon State University Press. ISBN 978-0870715761.
- Lee, Martin (2013). The Beast Reawakens: Fascism's Resurgence from Hitler's Spymasters to Today's Neo-Nazi Groups and Right-Wing Extremists. London: Routledge. ISBN 978-1135281311.
- Michael, George (2008). Willis Carto and the American Far Right. Gainesville: University Press of Florida. ISBN 978-0813031989.
- Mulhall, Joe (2020). British Fascism After the Holocaust: From the Birth of Denial to the Notting Hill Riots 1939–1958. London: Routledge. ISBN 978-0429840258.
- Muccigrosso, Ralph (1999). "American Mercury". In George A. Lopez; Ronald Lora; William Longton (eds.). The Conservative Press in Twentieth-century America. Westport: Greenwood Publishing Group. pp. 243–252. ISBN 0313213909.
- Théorêt, Hugues (January 2015). "Influence et rayonnement international d'Adrien Arcand". Globe Revue internationale d'études québécoises. 18 (1): 19–45. doi:10.7202/1037876ar.
- Tauber, Kurt (1967). Beyond Eagle and Swastika: German Nationalism Since 1945, Volume 2. Middletown, Connecticut: Wesleyan University Press.
- Toczek, Nick (2015). Haters, Baiters and Would-Be Dictators: Anti-Semitism and the UK Far Right. London: Routledge. ISBN 978-1317525882.
- Tolstoy, Nikolai (1979). Victims of Yalta. London: Corgi. ISBN 0552110302.
- Winston, Andrew (May 2020). "Scientific Racism and North American Psychology". Oxford Research Encyclopedia of Psychology: 1–26.
