= Ernest van den Haag =

German American Jewish social critic and author

- Photo of van den Haag from the John Simon Guggenheim Memorial Foundation
- Born: September 15, 1914; Berlin, Germany
- Died: March 21, 2002 (aged 87); Mendham Township, New Jersey, U.S.
- Education: University of Iowa

Ernest van den Haag (born "Ernest Rene Melamerson"; September 15, 1914 – March 21, 2002) was a German American Jewish economist, social critic, and author. He was John M. Olin Professor of Jurisprudence and Public Policy at Fordham University from 1982-1988 and a "Distinguished Scholar" of the Heritage Foundation. He was known for his participation in efforts to overturn Brown v. Board of Education through his role in the International Association for the Advancement of Ethnology and Eugenics, his strident arguments against immigration, his advocacy for capital punishment, and his contributions to National Review.

== Life and career ==
=== Early life and family ===
Ernest van den Haag was born in Berlin, Germany in 1914 as Ernest Rene Melamerson. Although reporting and personal interviews repeatedly characterized van den Haag as having been born in the Netherlands, official government documents, including an Alien Registration record, Social Security application, personnel record, immigration and naturalization documents, and Selective Service Registration Card consistently record Berlin, Germany as his place of birth.

Van den Haag's father, Moishe Melamerson, was born in the Lithuanian shtetl of Suwałki (now Poland) on October 17, 1881. Van den Haag's father studied law at the University of Zurich in Switzerland, where he changed his name to Max. In 1906, Max moved to Hamburg, where he attended the Talmud-Tora-Realshule and met van den Haag's mother, Flora Haag. Flora was born in Hamburg on May 23, 1898. She was part of the bourgeois class of German society and was related to Nobel Prize for Literature laureate, Thomas Mann.

Van den Haag's parents moved to Berlin, where they were active in the city's avant-garde and cabaret circles until 1926, when worsening antisemitism in Germany spurred their exodus. The family relocated to Vietri sul Mare, in Salerno, Italy, a location that had experienced an influx of German migrants due to increasing persecution and marginalization. In Italy, the Melamerson family founded the Industria Ceramica Salernitana (ICS), a ceramics factory, with Günther Stüdemann, a fellow émigré.

The ICS factory’s success extended to a prestigious commission: between 1931 and 1935, the factory produced approximately 100,000 tiles for the floors of Palazzo Venezia in Rome, then serving as Mussolini’s official residence. Seven years later, the Jewish owners of the factory that had tiled Mussolini’s study were interned in concentration camps.

=== Fate of his parents ===
Van den Haag’s parents remained in Italy throughout the war. In 1938, following the enactment of Italy’s racial laws, the Melamersons were registered at the civil registry in Vietri with the annotation “of the Jewish race.” By this time both Max and Flora had been rendered stateless. Max attempted to protect the business by filing for dissolution of the ICS and transferring activities to a nominally anonymous association, MACS (Manifattura Artistica Ceramica Salernitana), but was ultimately forced off its board and stripped of all property.

In July 1940, Max was interned at the camp at Agnone, in the province of Campobasso. Flora was initially held separately before both were transferred to the Lama dei Peligni camp in the province of Chieti on September 14, 1940. The couple were subsequently transferred to the Ferramonti di Tarsia internment camp in Calabria in October 1940, with one further intervening transfer to Acquapendente in October 1941, before being sent back to Ferramonti in January 1943, where they would remain until liberation.

Records confirm they remained in Cosenza as of March 30, 1945, receiving assistance as former political prisoners. Their home and factory had been entirely looted during their internment. After a period in Cosenza, they briefly returned to Vietri before relocating to Rome. Max Melamerson died in Rome in early 1948. Flora is recorded as arriving in New York aboard the SS Conte Biancamano on July 27, 1954. She later settled permanently in the United States, where she died.

=== Political activities and arrest ===
Van den Haag self-identified as having been a “communist” during his early political career in Italy, later describing himself as having been “a useful fool” who “didn’t realize that the communists were at least as bad as the fascists.” He was arrested by the government of Fascist Italy in 1937 and was referenced as an associate of Italian communist activist Ugo de Feo, an ICS employee, and de Feo's co-defendants, Antonio D'Ambrosio, and Aniello Raimond, during the trio's hearing by the Special Tribunal for the Defense of the State.

Van den Haag later claimed to have spent "nearly two years in solitary confinement" following his arrest. However, contemporaneous records place him at the University of Florence in November 1938, writing to the university rector regarding his enrollment, and being referenced as a corroborating source in tribunal proceedings in 1939, a timeline inconsistent with continuous imprisonment from 1937.

Declaration of Intention (Form N-315) filed April 1, 1942 by Ernest Rene Vandenhaag, born Ernest Melamerson, listing birthplace as Berlin, Germany, and entry to the United States aboard the SS Quanza on August 20, 1940.

=== Exile and emigration ===
After his release in Italy, van den Haag traveled to France. He had been rendered stateless since the Nuremberg Laws in 1935. Following the outbreak of war in September 1939, van den Haag was interned by French authorities as an enemy alien. A contemporaneous account written in 1941 by Sergio de Benedetti, an Italian physicist who left Italy for Paris after the Fascist government expelled Jewish citizens from university positions, records that van den Haag, still known at that time as Melamerson, was on vacation on the Atlantic coast when he was detained.

De Benedetti describes attempting to intercede with Pietro Nenni, former secretary of the Italian Socialist Party (PSI), to secure his release, without success. Van den Haag was subsequently held at the Cours du Médoc internment camp in Bordeaux. In June 1940, he was among the refugees who received visas from Aristides de Sousa Mendes, the Portuguese consul-general in Bordeaux, who issued thousands of visas to refugees fleeing Nazi-occupied France in defiance of explicit orders from António de Oliveira Salazar's Estado Novo regime. De Benedetti records that van den Haag’s release from the camp was secured when a sergeant agreed, under bribery, to sign papers that should have been authorized by a colonel.

Van den Haag later gave a different account, describing his departure from France as "dramatic". He stated he fled “in a very romantic way jumping on a truck and people shooting after me,” crossing into Spain before reaching Portugal. His contemporaneous Declaration of Intention, filed in 1942, lists his last foreign residence as Porto, Portugal, with no reference to Spain.

According to his Declaration of Intention, van den Haag resided in Porto, sometimes referenced as "Oporto", before departing aboard the SS Quanza (Note: Van den Haag was among 211 passengers who disembarked in New York. The ship's "List or manifest of alien passengers" shows his immigration visa, distinct from the Portuguese transit visa issued by Aristides de Sousa Mendes in Bordeaux in June 1940, was issued in Oporto on August 5, 1940. The "Race or People" column of the document identifies him as "French", although this entry was subsequently crossed out by an immigration official who wrote "Heb" over this field. The manifest further records his last permanent residence as Bordeaux, France, and his "Calling or occupation" as "commerce". After New York, the Quanza proceeded to Veracruz, Mexico, where Portuguese and Mexican authorities refused to allow the remaining refugees to disembark. The ship then sailed to Norfolk, Virginia, where the personal intervention of Eleanor Roosevelt secured permission for the remaining passengers to land. The incident had significant and ultimately counterproductive consequences for refugee admissions: Assistant Secretary of State Breckinridge Long, whose portfolio included refugee policy, used the episode as justification to overhaul the refugee admissions system, and later wrote that in response to the Quanza incident he had been "almost completely successful in halting the flow of all refugees" for most of the war. Holocaust historians Richard Breitman and Allan Lichtman concluded that Long "lost the Quanza battle" but "quietly won the war on refugees.") via Lisbon. Official documents, including the ship's passenger manifest, record his arrival in New York on August 20, 1940. The passenger manifest shows van den Haag was listed as French in the document's "Race or people" column, although this entry was subsequently crossed out by an immigration official who wrote "Heb" over it. This contrasts with van den Haag’s later account in which he described presenting himself to French authorities as Italian.

=== Career in the United States ===
Van den Haag arrived in New York speaking no English. He listed his older brother, Ralph Oscar Melamerson, who had arrived in New York with his wife and child in 1939, as his point of contact on government documents. He worked as a busboy and vegetable seller and submitted an application for aid to the Emergency Committee in Aid of Displaced Foreign Scholars. Official documents suggest he began utilizing the surname "van den Haag" (Note: His mother's maiden name was Haag. Van is a common prefix in Dutch surnames, sometimes appearing in combination with the article den. No source consulted for this article explicitly addresses van den Haag's motivation for adopting this particular surname, nor why published biographical accounts consistently described him as having been born in the Netherlands rather than Germany.) around this time, although "Melamerson" persists as a previous name on immigration and naturalization paperwork and his draft card.

Van den Haag earned a master's degree in economics in 1942 and began work at the Office of War Information as a propaganda analyst, a position he would hold until 1945. Also in 1942, he met the political philosopher Sidney Hook, whom he later credited with "converting" him from communism to conservatism.

Van den Haag gave lectures in psychology and sociology as a part-time instructor at Hofstra College of New York. He received his Ph.D. in economics from New York University in 1952 and in 1956, authored his first book, Education as an Industry. Although van den Haag held graduate degrees in economics and taught as an adjunct at the New School for Social Research, he was widely identified in published accounts as a sociologist and held an appointment as John M. Olin Professor of Jurisprudence and Public Policy at Fordham University. He held no graduate degree in either sociology or law.

Although van den Haag became widely known in later decades primarily as a proponent of capital punishment, historians have situated his earlier career within the organized scientific opposition to school desegregation. Historian John P. Jackson Jr. identifies him as a central figure in the International Association for the Advancement of Ethnology and Eugenics (IAAEE), an organization funded by Wickliffe Draper's Pioneer Fund and established in part to provide expert testimony that would undermine the decision in Brown v. Board of Education. The Pioneer Fund was designated a hate group by the Southern Poverty Law Center for its funding of race science research.

Van den Haag was among the IAAEE experts who testified in Stell v. Savannah-Chatham County Board of Education and Evers v. Jackson Municipal Separate School District. He also appeared before the International Court of Justice in the South West Africa cases on behalf of the government of apartheid South Africa.

Van den Haag died at age 88 on March 21, 2002 in Mendham, New Jersey after a brief illness. Following his death, obituaries appeared across a broad ideological spectrum. The New York Times described him as an "educator and backer of the death penalty." William F. Buckley, Jr. authored an obituary published in National Review, referencing van den Haag's 45-year history with the publication. VDARE, described by the Southern Poverty Law Center as an "an anti-immigration hate website", published a tribute by Peter Brimelow, a former National Review contributor himself, that praised van den Haag’s positions on immigration restriction. The Liberty Fund, which describes its mission as advancing individual liberty, has continued to distribute van den Haag’s work and produced a filmed interview with him as part of its intellectual portrait series.

=== On racial segregation in public schools ===
Van den Haag was an early opponent of the Supreme Court's decision in Brown v. Board of Education which found segregation in schools unconstitutional. Historian John P. Jackson Jr., characterized him as "one of the earliest critics of the use of social science in the case". Indeed, in his 1956 work Education as an Industry, van den Haag held that:

The desire for the maximization of liberty leads to the contention that there should be schools for whites, schools for Negroes, and schools which both can attend, just as there are colleges for males, females, and coeducational ones [...] Neither the legal enforcement of segregation nor compulsory congregation—the outlawing of segregation—are consistent with freedom.

Van den Haag was a central component of the IAAEE's coordinated efforts to introduce expert testimony supporting its position against school desegregation after Brown. To this end, the IAAEE inserted itself in cases in Georgia (Stell) and Mississippi (Evers) as third-party interveners, which enabled them to submit information and views to the Court without having to prove a direct legal interest in the outcome of the cases.

Within the organization's division of labor, van den Haag's designated role was to provide the social-theoretical rationale for segregation. He argued that segregation was psychologically beneficial to children regardless of their measured intelligence, due to what he characterized as a natural inclination to associate with members of their own racial group.

Jackson argues that van den Haag reduced the nearly sixty other studies cited in the social science brief submitted to the Supreme Court to the projective doll studies conducted by psychologists Kenneth and Mamie Clark and suggested this tactic became “one of the most important features of the post-decision arguments" against the social science supporting the Brown decision.

Jackson found van den Haag's testimony to have misrepresented Clark's trial testimony, attacked a version of the doll tests that Clark had not advanced, and introduced a counter-study that failed to address Clark's actual argument.

During his testimony in Stell, van den Haag compared his position to that of a historical dissenter from majority opinion, stating:

When Galileo decided that the earth moves around the sun the majority opinion at that time decided or insisted that the sun moves around the earth, but Galileo was right, though he was a minority of one, and so should I find myself in this minority of one I would not regret it.

Jackson notes that in making this comparison van den Haag mistook Galileo’s discoveries for those of Copernicus.

In a National Review cover-page article, van den Haag dismissed recent research undermining the notion of innate ethnic differences in intelligence, stating that he believed such differences existed and accounted for "much" of the poorer academic performance of black students, thus necessitating separate schooling. The article prompted angry letters from several readers objecting to the decision to print such "bigotry."

In 1966, van den Haag testified before the International Court of Justice in the South West Africa cases on behalf of the government of apartheid South Africa, during which he accused Kenneth Clark of having "faked" the evidence underlying the social science testimony in Brown:

Mr. van den Haag: [...] not only is there no evidence for [Negro feelings of inferiority resulting from segregation] but whatever evidence appears in the body of [the Social Science Statement in Brown] has been largely faked.
Mr. Gross: Has been largely what, sir?
Mr. van den Haag: Faked.
Mr. Gross: Faked? F.A.K.E.D.?
Mr. van den Haag: Yes, sir.
Mr. Gross: By whom, sir?
Mr. van den Haag: By Professor Kenneth Clark.

=== On race-neutrality in U.S. immigration policy ===
In another article, from 1965, he opposed the Immigration and Nationality Act of 1965, which replaced an immigration system largely excluding Asians and discriminating against southern and eastern Europeans with a race-neutral program based on skills and family connections to U.S. citizens and permanent residents, which enabled an increase in immigration from Asia. Van den Haag instead advocated greater rather than less immigration restriction. He also expressly defended the practice of fashioning immigration policies in favor of European ethnicity, arguing that "The wish to preserve... the identity of one's nation requires no justification." He likened such a practice to a harmless expression of sentiment, similar to preferring to associate with one's own family rather than strangers. "The wish not to see one's country overrun by groups one regards as alien need not be based on feelings of superiority or 'racism.'"

=== On the death penalty ===
Van den Haag's particular field of interest, the field he contributed the most to in terms of publications, was the death penalty, particularly in the context of the capital punishment debate in the United States before and after the Furman v. Georgia ruling in 1972, which (temporarily) abolished capital punishment nationwide. Van den Haag was a respected debater, and when he was not contributing to the National Review or other publications, he was active in debating the issue of the death penalty. His main argument in its defence stemmed from key themes such as deterrence, and retributive punishment for severe criminals. On Firing Line, he joined a programme dedicated to the death penalty debate on December 13, 1976, after the Gregg v. Georgia ruling (but weeks before the resumption of executions with Gary Gilmore, who was a subject of the deterrence argument) and was cited in a previous programme with Truman Capote in 1968, regarding an off-cam argument with regard to the efficiency of the punishment, which Capote challenged.

In his book Punishing Criminals, van den Haag defines the primary role of government as "securing rights and duties by specifying them through laws and enforcing the laws." Van den Haag believed the paramount duty of government is to "provide legal order in which citizens can be secure in their lives, their liberties, and their pursuit of happiness." Van den Haag disputed claims that capital punishment is just a form of legal retribution by claiming that if laws are knowingly broken, legal order can only be maintained by enforcement. Justice, van den Haag claimed, is blindfolded, while retribution carries the weight of passion behind it; justice being delivered to someone who violates social order knowingly is equal, thus the term legal retribution is void.

Van den Haag also argued that people commit crimes because they believe, one way or another, they will benefit from committing the crime. Thus it is society's duty to increase the opportunity cost of all crime. Van den Haag also related Marxist theory behind his justification of the death penalty. Marxists, Van den Haag argued, believe that "Legal justice never can do less, though it can do more." Legal justice should distribute punishment equally among violators and more frequently in order to deter crime. Van den Haag also related to the Marxist belief in class warfare. Van den Haag states, "Obviously, the poor and powerless are more tempted to take what is not theirs, or to rebel, than the powerful and wealthy, who need not take what they already have." The threat of severe punishment diminishes temptation, which van den Haag argued is to be the greatest use of the death penalty, deterrence.

Van den Haag also believed that law breakers have more of an inclination to repeat their bad actions. He said that breaking the law leads to a form of moral decay, in which offenders can no longer distinguish right from wrong, and thus repeat offending is common. To lower the crime rate, and the tendency of individuals toward committing more violent crimes over time, van den Haag said, "The only permanent, and irrevocable incapacitation is execution." Van den Haag believed that any temporary or permanent incapacitation only reduces the crime rate if there are no more compensating increases in crime by other people. He argued that, without the strong deterrent effect of a death penalty, an increase in crime and criminals remains a factor. Van den Haag believed homicide to be the most deplorable crime a human being can commit. In his book The Death Penalty : A Debate, he argues that "the state must teach that killing anyone deliberately, for whatever reason, is needless and wrong."

Van den Haag believed that capital punishment has a direct correlation with a decrease in murders. Rehabilitation as a response to criminals who murder is not an option because, as van den Haag states, "no effective method to achieve it [rehabilitation] has been found." He said that, even if a proper method of rehabilitation can be found, it would not reduce the crime rate, because rehabilitation only works after the crime has been committed, i.e. in the case of murder, once an innocent life had been lost. He argued that deterrence is the only thing that can have any effect on the actual crime rate. Overall, van den Haag directed his argument toward the fact that the death penalty ought only to exist to protect innocent lives. To sum up his entire argument against his opposition in one quote, van den Haag contends, "I'd rather execute a man convicted of having murdered others than put the lives of innocents at risk. I find it hard to understand the opposite choice."

While he recognized that innocent people would sometimes be executed, Van den Haag contended that no penalty was irreversible, except for fines, and that while an execution (once performed) was also irrevocable - that is, could not be undone or set aside - the notion of sentencing innocents to prison time unduly was equally disturbing, and in no way certain to be discovered. As the prospect of execution would purportedly harden a jury not to impose a guilty verdict easily, the irrevocability sentiment viz. a life sentence would make a court more prone to mistakes, also with disastrous consequences. The innocence argument, in Van den Haag's mind, thus must be aimed at the justice system, and not exclusively against a punishment as such.

== Published works (selection) ==
Van den Haag was a prolific writer throughout his life, authoring books, articles, reviews, rejoinders, and opinion pieces across an array of topics. Between 1957 and 1994, he wrote "close to 200" articles for National Review. His works include:

- Economic and Social Aspects of Education, 1952 (dissertation)
- Academic Freedom and Its Defense, 1954
- Controlling Subversive Groups, 1955
- Education as an Industry, 1956
- The Roots of American Communism, 1957
- The Fabric of Society, 1957 (co-authored with Ralph Ross)
- Social science testimony in the desegregation cases : a reply to Professor Kenneth Bancroft Clark, 1960
- German Catholics in Hitler's Wars, 1964
- The lesson of the Congo, 1964
- Intelligence or prejudice?, 1964
- The UN's idiot policy in the Congo, 1965
- More immigration?, 1965
- The Jewish Mystique, 1968 (Note: In a filmed interview, van den Haag described his motivation for writing The Jewish Mystique as stemming from the fact that "most of my friends were Jewish," without identifying as Jewish himself (at 1:01:30). A contemporary review in Jewish Social Studies described him as a "gentile." His federal records consistently identify him as "Hebrew". Italian internment records identify both his parents as Jewish and both were registered at the civil registry in Vietri with the annotation "of the Jewish race" on their records following the enactment of Italy's racial laws in 1938.)
- On Deterrence and the Death Penalty, 1968
- Passionate Simplemindedness, 1968
- Blackness and Competence, 1969
- Women, How equal?, 1970
- Epistle to the Babylonians: An Essay on the Natural Inequality of Man, 1971
- When is a crime a war crime?, 1970
- Political violence and civil disobedience, 1972
- The Balancing act. Quota hiring in higher education, 1975 (co-authored with George Charles Roche)
- Punishing Criminals: Concerning a Very Old and Painful Question, 1975
- No Excuse for Crime, 1976
- More on Political Violence, 1976
- Punishment as a Device for Controlling the Crime Rate, 1981
- The Death Penalty: A Debate, 1983 (co-authored with John P. Conrad)
- Smashing liberal icons : a collection of debates, 1984
- The Death Penalty: The Death Penalty Vindicates The Law, 1985
- The Neoclassical Theory Of Crime Control, 1986
- The U.N., in or out? : a debate between Ernest van den Haag and John P. Conrad, 1987 (co-authored with John P. Conrad)
- U.S. ends and means in Central America : a debate, 1988 (co-authored with Tom J. Farer)
- Is the United Nations Useful?, 1989
- Sodom and Begorrah: the St. Patrick's day flap in New York was a clash between 'gay rights' and Catholic values; 'hate the sin but love the sinner' is now deemed insensitive; but what rights should homosexuals have?, 1991
- Emmett Till, 1991
- Thinking About Rape, 1992
- Causes, Alleged and Actual, of the L.A. Riots, 1993
- Academic Freedom and Tenure, 1994
- Why Does Suicide Have a Bad Reputation?, 1998
- The Hostility of Intellectuals to Capitalism, 2000
