= Herbert Charles Sanborn =

American philosopher and antisemite (1873–1967)

- Born: February 18, 1873; Winchester, Massachusetts
- Died: July 6, 1967 (aged 94); Williamson County, Tennessee
- Education: Boston University; Tufts College; Ludwig-Maximilians-Universität München
- Occupations: Philosopher, psychologist, academic, German teacher and translator

Herbert Charles Sanborn (February 18, 1873 – July 6, 1967) was an American philosopher, academic and one-time political candidate. He was the chair of the Department of Philosophy and Psychology at Vanderbilt University in Nashville, Tennessee, from 1921 to 1942, and he served as the president of the Nashville German-American Society. He founded and coached the Vanderbilt fencing team. He ran for the Tennessee State Senate unsuccessfully in 1955. He was opposed to the Civil Rights Movement, and he published antisemitic pamphlets.

== Early life ==
Herbert Charles Sanborn was born on February 18, 1873, in Winchester, Massachusetts.

Sanborn graduated with a Bachelor of Philosophy from Boston University in 1896, where one of his professors was Borden Parker Bowne. He received a master's degree from Tufts College in 1897. He studied on a scholarship at Heidelberg University in 1900. Shortly after, he taught German in New England schools, eventually becoming Head of German instruction at the Bancroft School in Worcester, Massachusetts. During that time, he wrote a book about Viktor Nessler's 1884 opera Der Trompeter von Säkkingen, which was reviewed in a German journal.

Sanborn returned to Germany for graduate studies in 1906, and he received a PhD magna cum laude from the Ludwig-Maximilians-Universität München in 1908. His PhD thesis, written in German and supervised by Georg von Hertling, was about William James.

== Academic career ==
Sanborn was professor of philosophy and psychology at Washington College in Chestertown, Maryland, from 1909 to 1911. In 1911, he was hired by Chancellor James Hampton Kirkland as an associate professor of philosophy at Vanderbilt University in Nashville, Tennessee to replace Collins Denny, a bishop of the Methodist Episcopal Church, South who had tried to "impose theological control over the university." Sanborn remained associate professor until 1921, when he was promoted to full professor in 1921. He served as the chair of its Department of Philosophy from 1921 to 1942. Additionally, he taught at the Peabody College during summer terms. One of Sanborn's students was Lyle H. Lanier. Other students included Donald Davidson and Allen Tate, who looked up to Sanborn. According to Davidson, Sanborn would pepper his lectures with "quotations from the original Sanskrit, Greek, Latin, German, French, or Italian, which of course he would not insult us by translating." Davidson complained that after taking Sanborn's classes, he "did not have the least idea about schools of philosophy or such philosophical terms as epistemology and ontology", nor did he know anything about Plato. Moreover, critic Thomas A. Underwood suggests that Sanborn "fell back on a highly abstract, theoretical vocabulary in his lectures."

Sanborn served as the president of the Southern Society for Philosophy and Psychology in 1923. His inaugural address was entitled "Aesthetics and Civilization"; it was published in the Peabody Journal of Education a year later, in 1924. Two years later, in 1926, he translated Psychological Studies by Theodor Lipps from German into English.

Sanborn published Methodology and Psychology in 1928. In it, he argued that psychology offered many different theories because the science could not be as comprehensive as lived experience. He rejected materialism as well as strict behaviorism. Instead, his approach was positivistic and empirical, even though he focused on personalities and the "individual." Later, Sanborn wrote a book about Hugo Dingler, a German philosopher.

Sanborn coached the Vanderbilt baseball team in 1912 and 1913. In 1934, he founded the Vanderbilt fencing team and served as its coach until 1957. The team won the Southeastern Conference in 1940–1942. Even though Sanborn retired from Vanderbilt University in 1942, he continued to coach the fencing team for fifteen more years. In a 1957 interview with the Anderson Herald of Anderson, Indiana, he lamented that fencing had become a "lost art" on Southern campuses. A foilist, Sanborn competed individually, for example taking part in a national fencing competition in New Orleans, Louisiana, in 1937.

Sanborn regularly disagreed with James Hampton Kirkland, the chancellor of Vanderbilt University, who had also studied in Germany. The retirement age was set at 65 to force him into retirement. Sanborn appealed to the American Association of University Professors, but he was forced to retire two years later, in 1942.

In 1961, Sanborn was an early editor of Mankind Quarterly, an academic journal of scientific racism. He was also an early member of its sponsor, the International Association for the Advancement of Ethnology and Eugenics, a promoter of racial segregation.

== Political activism ==
Sanborn, who was the president of the Nashville German-American Society, supported Germany at the outset of World War I. He supported Austria's ultimatum to Serbia, opining that the Balkans were "on the plane of semi-savagery." However, in a 1917 interview with The Tennessean, he said, "There cannot be the slightest doubt as to the loyalty of the German-Americans to the United States in the current crisis." He went on to deny that he had pro-German sentiments, saying he was "clean."

In 1925, Sanborn supported the Butler Act.

After World War II, he campaigned for the release of Karl Dönitz, Adolf Hitler's successor as the last leader of Nazi Germany.

In 1954–1955, Sanborn ran for the Tennessee State Senate as a candidate for the Conservative Party, but he was defeated by Democratic candidate Richard Fulton.

In 1955, Sanborn self-published antisemitic pamphlets entitled The International Conspiracy, in which he falsely argued that the Jews controlled international banking. He also wrote against interracial marriage. He was an honorary editor of the neo-Nazi periodical Western Destiny published by Willis Carto. He was also an editor for The American Mercury. He opposed the Civil Rights Movement in the 1950s and 1960s, and characterized desegregation as "the first step toward national suicide".

== Death ==
Sanborn died at age 94 on July 6, 1967, in a hospital in Williamson County, Tennessee.

== Bibliography ==
=== As an author ===
- Uber die ldentitat der Person bei William James (Leipzig-Eutritzsch: Leipzig Böhme & Lehmann, 1909).
- Our founders and their Fatherland (USA, 1916).
- Aesthetics and Civilization (Nashville, Tennessee: George Peabody College for Teachers, 1923).
- The dachshund or teckel; a complete treatise on the history, breeding, training, care and management (New York, Orange Judd Pub. Co., 1949).
- Philosophies and psychologies. (St. Louis, Missouri, 1952).
- Dingler's methodical philosophy. (Milano: Editrice La Fiaccola, 1952).
- The function of history in liberal education. (1950s).
- The International Conspiracy (Brentwood, Tennessee, 1955).

=== As an editor ===
- Sudermann's Teja (edited and annotated by Herbert Charles Sanborn, New York: Henry Holt & Co., 1906).
- Diseases of canaries (by Robert Stroud; edited by Herbert Charles Sanborn; Kansas City, Missouri : Canary Publishers Co., 1933).
