= Reginald Ruggles Gates =

Canadian eugenicist (1882–1962)

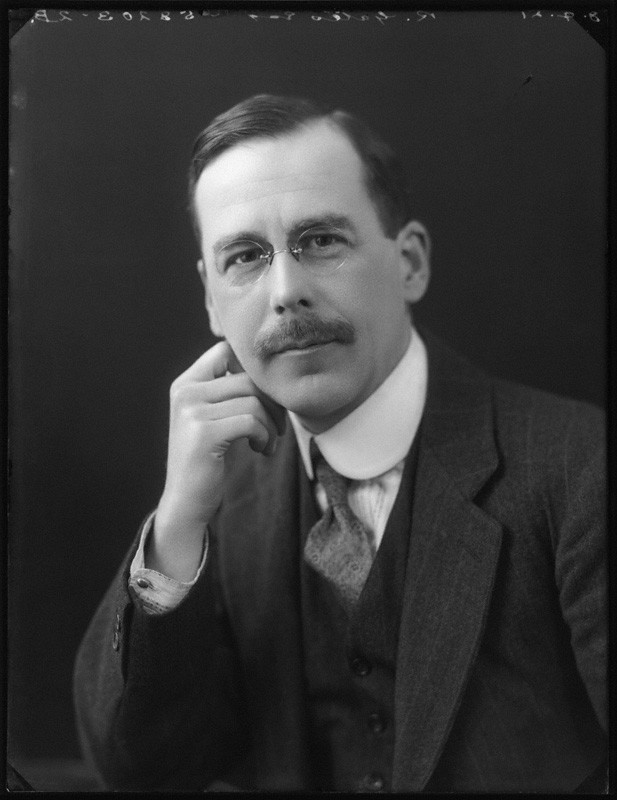
- Reginald Ruggles Gates in 1921
- Born: May 1, 1882 near Middleton, Nova Scotia, Canada
- Died: August 12, 1962 (aged 80)
- Education: Mount Allison University; McGill University; University of Chicago
- Spouse(s): Marie Stopes (1911–1914, annulled); Jennie Williams (1929, dissolved); Laura Greer (1955–)
- Awards: Fellow of the Royal Society
- Scientific career
- Fields: Spermatophytes, Oenothera
- Workplaces: King's College London
- Author abbrev. (botany)

Reginald Ruggles Gates (May 1, 1882 – August 12, 1962), was a Canadian-born geneticist who published widely in the fields of botany and eugenics.

== Early life ==
Reginald Ruggles Gates was born on May 1, 1882, near Middleton, Nova Scotia, to a family of English ancestry. He had a twin sister named Charlotte.

Gates graduated with first class honours in science from Mount Allison University in 1903. Further studies toward a second B.Sc. from McGill University were interrupted by a year in which he returned to his childhood home in Middleton, Nova Scotia, where he served as vice-principal in a local school. He completed this second B.Sc. in 1905, focusing on botany, before accepting a Senior Fellowship at University of Chicago where he completed his Ph.D. on heredity in Oenothera lata (evening primrose) in 1908.

== Career ==
Gates did botanical work in Missouri in 1910. Later, he was a lecturer at Bedford College, London and Professor of Biology at King's College London. He was known for his studies of Oenothera and other plants.

Gates was elected a Fellow of the Royal Society in 1931. His nomination reads

Professor Gates enjoys a widespread reputation as a distinguished investigator of cytological problems and especially in connection with genetics. He has thrown much light on the behaviour of Oenothera, which formed the basis of De Vries well-known theory of mutations. He has trained a number of cytological students, some of whom now fill posts of importance. He is the author of over 100 papers and memoirs, some of which have been published by the Royal Society. Latterly he has paid attention to genetical anthropology and is the author of several books on this subject.

Additionally, Gates was a eugenicist. In 1923, he wrote Heredity and Eugenics. He maintained his ideas on race and eugenics long after World War II, into the era when these were deemed anachronistic. He was a founder of Mankind Quarterly and the International Association for the Advancement of Ethnology and Eugenics, his articles abounded in the journal as Acta Geneticae Medicae et Gemellologiae. He was a strong opponent of interracial marriage and, according to A. S. Winston, "argued that races were separate species," having classified moderns humans as five different species in 1944.

== Personal life ==
In 1911, Gates married Marie Stopes, but the marriage was annulled in 1914, with Stopes claiming the marriage had not been consummated. Gates did not contest the divorce, although he disputed Stopes's claims, describing her as "super-sexed to a degree that was almost pathological" and adding to this "I could have satisfied the desires of any normal woman".

Gates married Jennie Williams in 1929; the marriage was later dissolved. In 1955, he married Laura Greer.

== Death and legacy ==
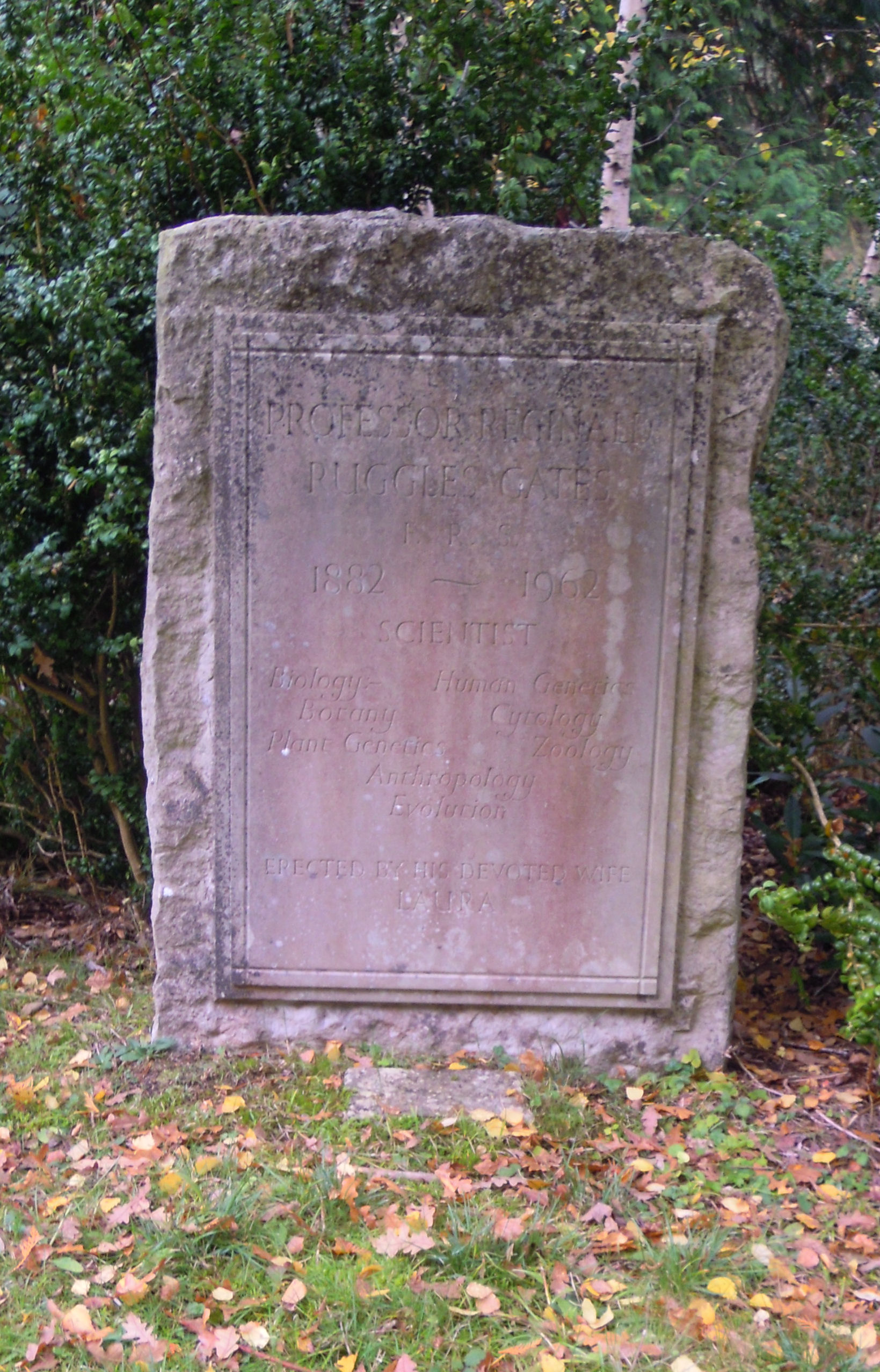
The grave of Reginald Ruggles Gates in Brookwood Cemetery

Gates died on August 12, 1962, and was buried in Brookwood Cemetery in Surrey, England. He is memorialized by the Ruggles Gates Award at Mount Allison University.

== Selected publications ==
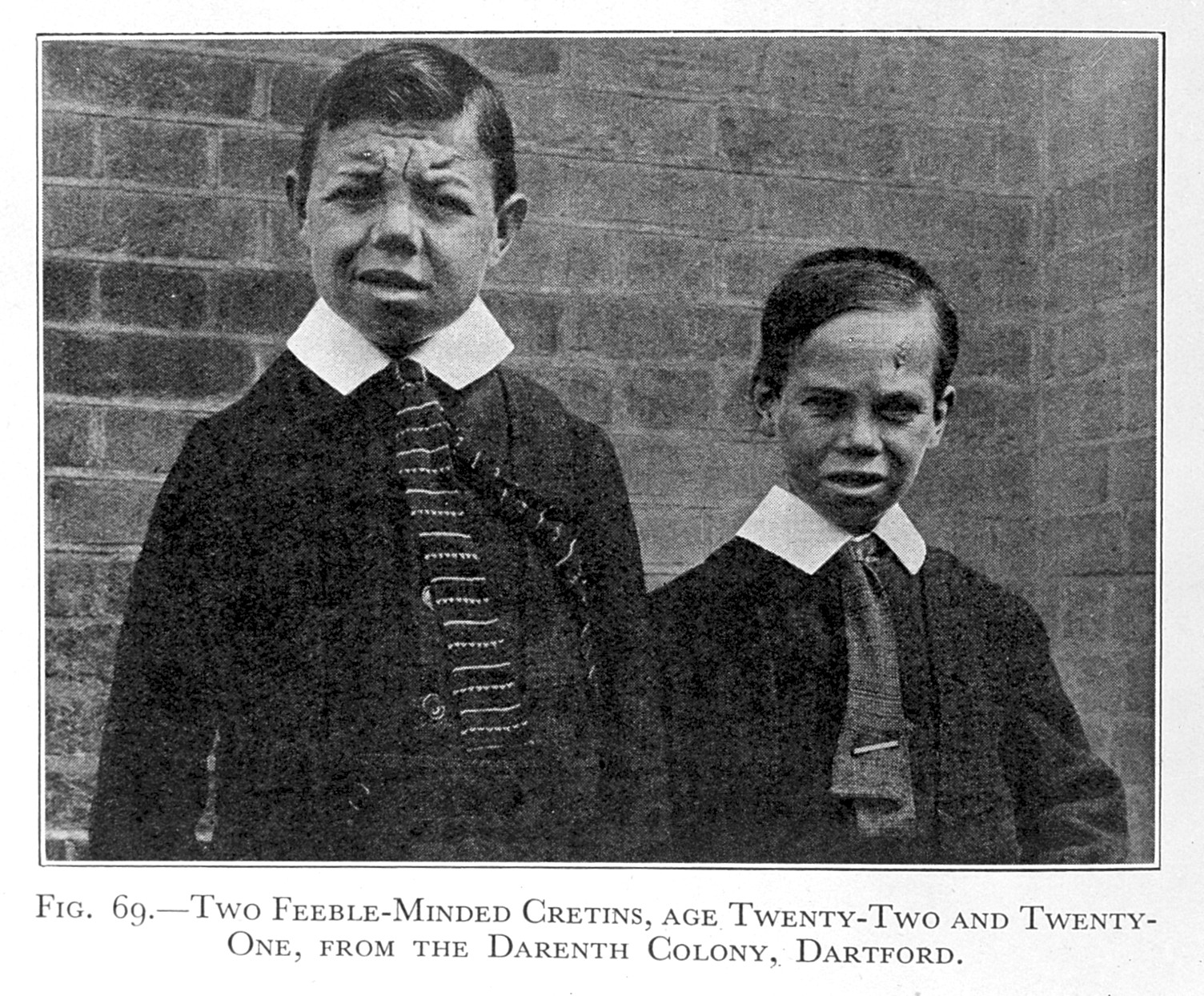
Illustration from Heredity in Man

- Heredity and Eugenics. (1923). Constable & Co Limited. London, Sydney, Bombay.
- Heredity in Man. (1929). Constable & Company.
- A botanist in the Amazon Valley. (1927). H. F. & G. Witherby.
- Human Genetics. (1946). The Macmillan company (2 volumes).
- Human Ancestry. (1948). Harvard University Press.
- "Racial elements in the aborigines of Queensland, Australia". (Jan. 1960). Zeitschrift für Morphologie und Anthropologie. Bd. 50. H. 2. pp. 150–166.
