= Clan Gayre =

Scottish clan

Clan Gayre or Clan Gair purports to be a Highland Scottish clan.

== Origins of the Clan ==
Robert Gayre of Gayre and Nigg (original name Robert Gair), the father of the present chief, created the clan after World War II. Robert Gayre invented the Clan and its history.

Gayre claimed to be the Chief of "Clan Gayre" and "Clan Gayre and Nigg". In 1947, he wrote a book titled Gayre's Booke: Being a History of the Family of Gayre in which he presented an ancestry that supposedly established his claim to be the chieftain of the Clan of Gayre; however no clan or sept by that name is mentioned in any record prior to Gayre's use of it in the second quarter of the 20th century.

World Orders of Knighthood and Merit by Guy Stair Sainty (published by Burke's Peerage) refers to "the late Robert Gayre (first Chief of the newly formed Clan Gayre)".

The Glasgow Herald newspaper, on 14 June 1975, wrote, "Robert Gayre, of Gayre and Nigg, is singular among genealogists, dynasts and the like, if only for the reason that, alone among them, he has been able to create a Scottish clan from scratch, providing it with traditions, rituals, precedences and privileges...".

In 2017 the genealogist Anthony J. Camp showed that Gayre did not himself have a male-line descent from earlier families of that surname.

== Clan Chief ==
The current self-styled chief of the Clan Gayre is Reinold Gayre of Gayre and Nigg.
