= Northern League (neo-Nazi organisation) =

British neo-Nazi political organization

- Formation: 1957
- Founder: Roger Pearson; Peter Huxley-Blythe; Alastair Harper
- Type: Neo-Nazi organization
- Region served: United Kingdom and northern continental Europe
- Fields: Scientific racism; White nationalism; Eugenics
- Key people: Roger Pearson; Peter Huxley-Blythe; Hans F. K. Günther; Robert Gayre; Robert E. Kuttner; Donald A. Swan; Earnest Sevier Cox; Arthur Ehrhardt
- Publication: The Northlander; Northern World
- Affiliations: Britons Publishing Society

The Northern League was a neo-Nazi organisation founded by Roger Pearson. It was active in the United Kingdom and in northern continental Europe in the latter half of the 20th century.

== History ==
Pearson established the Northern League in collaboration with Peter Huxley-Blythe, who had been active in several neo-Nazi organizations with connections in Germany and North America. The League published the periodical The Northlander.

According to its founders, the League’s stated objective was to preserve the so-called "Nordic race" from what they described as the "annihilation of our kind" and to "fight for survival against forces which would mongrelize our race and civilization". The Northern League later merged its publications with those of the Britons Publishing Company, an antisemitic press and one of the principal distributors of the Protocols of the Elders of Zion.

Prominent members included the Nazi racial eugenicist Hans F. K. Günther, who continued to publish under a pseudonym in the post-war period. Other figures associated with the League were Robert Gayre, founder of Mankind Quarterly; its editors Robert E. Kuttner and Donald A. Swan; the American segregationist Earnest Sevier Cox; and former Waffen-SS officer and post-war neo-Nazi leader Arthur Ehrhardt. Several post-war British fascists were also involved. Contemporary observers, including other far-right groups, regarded the Northern League as particularly extreme in its racial ideology.

Among its co-founders and later activists was Alastair Harper, who stood as a United Kingdom Independence Party (UKIP) parliamentary candidate for Dunfermline West in 2001.

Northern League publications adopted the rhetoric and style of scientific racism, drawing influence from authors such as Raymond B. Cattell, a collaborator of Pearson. The League’s Statement of Aims reflected nineteenth-century concepts of Rasse and Volk. Andrew S. Winston of the University of Guelph analyzed the group’s ideology as follows:

According to the “Aims”, Northern Europeans are described as “the purest survival of the great Indo-European family of nations, sometimes referred to as the Caucasian race and at other times as the Aryan race.” It asserted that most “classic civilizations of the past were the product of these Indo-European peoples.” Intermarriage with conquered populations was said to lead to the decay of those civilizations, particularly through unions with slaves. The “rising tide of color,” according to the League, threatened to overwhelm European society and bring about the “biological annihilation of the subspecies.”
