= Journal of Social, Political and Economic Studies =

Quarterly academic journal

- Discipline: Economics, political science, sociology
- Language: English
- Edited by: Roger Pearson

Publication details
- Former names: Journal of Social and Political Studies
- History: 1976-2023
- Publisher: Scott-Townsend Publishers
- Frequency: Quarterly

Standard abbreviations
- ISO 4: J. Soc. Political Econ. Stud.

Indexing
- ISSN: 0278-839X
- LCCN: 82644115
- OCLC no.: 691862682

Links
- Journal homepage

The Journal of Social, Political and Economic Studies was a quarterly journal published by the Council for Social and Economic Studies. It was founded in 1976 by anthropologist Roger Pearson, and was originally published by The Council of American Affairs, an American representative in the World Anti Communist League. It was published by the Council for Social and Economic Studies, of which Pearson was the president as of 1982. It had been identified as one of two international journals which regularly published articles pertaining to race and intelligence with the goal of supporting the idea that white people are inherently superior (the other such journal being Mankind Quarterly). Notable contributors to the journal include Jack Kemp, Jesse Helms, and Robert S. McNamara. In 1982, U.S. President Ronald Reagan wrote a letter to Pearson personally thanking him for the most recent issue of the Journal, which was never disavowed by the White House. The White House did, however, request that Pearson stop using the letter for the purposes of publicity. According to the journal's website, Vol. 47, Nos. 3-4 (Fall -Winter 2022) was the final issue.
