= A. F. X. Baron =

British politician (1913–1974)

Anthony Francis Xavier Baron (4 October 1913 – 3 November 1974) was a British far-right political figure in the 1940s and 1950s who founded and headed the English branch of the Nationalist Information Bureau (NATINFORM). Baron has been described as "a stocky man..., with the features of a professional boxer." He operated from a base in Framlingham, Suffolk.

Baron was a supporter of Arnold Leese and attempted, with other Leese supporters in 1948, to establish a new group called the National Workers Party, with Baron as nominal leader. The group however foundered, due largely to the internal struggles between Baron and another leading member Tony Gittens. The two also struggled for control of The Britons, Baron acting as secretary of the group from 1949 to 1951, when he left the group and Gittens took over. Leese sided with Gittens and broke off his relationship with Baron.

Baron subsequently became close to Peter Huxley-Blythe and the two established NATINFORM in the early 1950s. The pair soon quarrelled, with Huxley-Blythe attacking Baron as a Nazi, and both Baron and his closest ally, Karl Smets (head of a German branch of NATINFORM) were expelled from the group. However they established their own version of NATINFORM and it soon became the more important of the two claimant to the name. During the 1950s Baron co-operated closely with South African far-right leader Oswald Pirow after Pirow ended his earlier relationship with Oswald Mosley.

In the 1960s and 1970s Baron ran the East Anglian Forum in Ipswich. He produced monthly bulletins about various issues, including opposition to abortions or not joining the Common Market, as well as support for South Africa and the apartheid government. His main focus was largely supporting Ian Smith's government in Rhodesia. He also supported Dr David Brown who ran for parliament for the National Democratic Party in Ipswich. Baron held large public meetings and was a supporter of Enoch Powell.

== Bibliography ==
- Coogan, Kevin (1999). Dreamer of the Day: Francis Parker Yockey and the Postwar Fascist International. Brooklyn: Autonomedia. ISBN 978-1-57027-039-0.
- Graham Macklin, Very Deeply Dyed in Black - Sir Oswald Mosley and the Resurrection of British Fascism after 1945, (IB Tauris, 2007)
- Dave Renton, Fascism, Anti-Fascism and Britain in the 1940s (Palgrave Macmillan, 2000, ISBN 0-312-22501-6).
- Kurt P. Tauber, Beyond Eagle and Swastika: German Nationalism Since 1945 (Wesleyan University Press, 1967).
- Nick Toczek, Haters, Baiters and Would-Be Dictators: Anti-Semitism and the UK Far Right, Routledge, 2015
- Kevin Coogan, "Lost Imperium: the European Liberation Front (1949-54)" in Patterns of Prejudice Volume 36, Number 3, July 1, 2002, p. 20 (Publisher: Routledge, part of the Taylor & Francis Group, ISSN 0031-322X).
