= Henry Garrett (psychologist) =

American psychologist and segregationist (1894–1973)

- Born: Henry Edward Garrett; January 27, 1894; Clover, Virginia, U.S.
- Died: June 26, 1973 (aged 79); Charlottesville, Virginia, U.S.
- Education: University of Richmond (BA); Columbia University (MA, PhD)
- Spouse: Mildred Burch (m. until 1973)

Henry Edward Garrett (January 27, 1894 – June 26, 1973) was an American psychologist and segregationist. Garrett was President of the American Psychological Association in 1946 and Chair of Psychology at Columbia University from 1941 to 1955. After he left Columbia, he was visiting professor at the University of Virginia. A.S. Winston chronicles that he was involved in the International Association for the Advancement of Ethnology and Eugenics (IAAEE), the journal Mankind Quarterly, the neofascist Northern League, and the ultra-right wing political group, the Liberty Lobby.

== Early life and education ==
Henry Edward Garrett was born on January 27, 1894, in Clover, Virginia. He was educated in public schools in Richmond, Virginia. He graduated from the University of Richmond in 1915, and received a master's degree and a PhD from Columbia University.

== Career ==
Garrett began his academic career at Columbia University, where he became a full Professor of Psychology at Columbia in 1943. Meanwhile, he served as the chair of its Psychology Department from 1941 to 1955. In the 1950s Garrett helped organize an international group of scholars dedicated to preventing "race-mixing", preserving segregation, and promoting the principles of early 20th century eugenics and "race hygiene". Garrett was a strong opponent of the 1954 United States Supreme Court's desegregation decision in Brown v. Board of Education, which he predicted would lead to "total demoralization and then disorganization in that order." He had given testimony favoring secondary school segregation in the Virginia case that was combined into Brown.

In 1955, Garrett became a visiting professor in the Department of Education at the University of Virginia. However, he was denied full professorship in the Department of Psychology due to his views on race.

Garrett wrote a 1961 article in the journal Perspectives in Biology and Medicine entitled "The Equalitarian Dogma" in which he argued that cumulative evidence supported the view that there was a biologically innate intellectual inferiority of Blacks to Whites. Because of its ambiguous conclusion, one contemporary was concerned that the purpose of the article, and of the publisher's decision to print it, was to hand a political weapon to the white supremacists then violently opposing desegregation. At the September 1961 meeting of the American Psychological Association, the Society for the Psychological Study of Social Issues passed a resolution taking exception to this paper, declaring that the evidence supported the view that intellectual differences between Whites and Blacks were not biologically innate, and that there was evidence for Black-White equality in intelligence under comparable conditions. Garrett disputed this resolution in an article in The American Psychologist the following year.

Garrett co-wrote the introduction to Carleton Putnam's Race and Reason, published in 1961. According to A.S. Winston, he "praised Byram Campbell's analysis of the Nordic as the ideal race." He is credited with coining the term equalitarian dogma in 1961 to describe the by then mainstream view that there were no race differences in intelligence, or if there were, they were purely the result of environmental factors. He accused the Jews of spreading the dogma, and wrote that most Jewish organizations "belligerently support the equalitarian dogma which they accept as having been 'scientifically' proven". He wrote in the White Citizens' Council monthly journal The Citizen, "Despite glamorized accounts to the contrary, the history of Black Africa over the past 5,000 years is largely a blank," and, "The crime record of the Negro in the United States is little short of scandalous" (Garrett 1968).

Garrett served as a Director of the Pioneer Fund from 1972 to 1973.

== Death ==
Garrett died on June 26, 1973, in Charlottesville, Virginia.

== Bibliography ==
- Garrett, Henry Edward (1922). A study of the relation of accuracy to speed. New York, New York. LCCN 24008270.
- Garrett, Henry Edward (1926). Statistics in psychology and education. with an introduction by R.S. Woodworth. New York, New York: Longmans, Green and Co. LCCN 26004149.
- Garrett, Henry Edward (1930). Great experiments in psychology. New York, New York: The Century Company. LCCN 30012633.
- Garrett, Henry Edward; Matthew R. Schneck (1933). Psychological tests, methods, and results. New York, New York: Harper & Brothers. LCCN 33020547.
- Garrett, Henry Edward; Alice I. Bryan; Ruth E. Perl (1935). The age factor in mental organization. New York, New York. LCCN 35014992.
- Garrett, Henry Edward (1950). Psychology. New York, New York: American Book Company. LCCN 50006041.
- Garrett, Henry Edward (1956). Elementary statistics. New York, New York: Longmans, Green. LCCN 56006220.
- Garrett, Henry Edward (1959). Testing for teachers. New York, New York: American Book Co. LCCN 59016244.
- Garrett, Henry Edward (1964). The art of good teaching. New York, New York: D. McKay Company. LCCN 64013107.
- Garrett, Henry Edward (1967). Children: black and white. Kilmarnock, Virginia: Patrick Henry Press. LCCN 73171730.
- Garrett, H.E. (1968) "Scientist Explains Race Differences," The Citizen, January, pp. 14–19.
- Garrett, Henry Edward (1973). IQ and racial differences. Cape Canaveral, FL: H. Allen. LCCN 73166371.
- Garrett, H.E. (1980). I.Q. and Racial Differences. Newport Beach, CA: Noontide Press, 1980.
