= The Faces of Janus =

2000 book by A. James Gregor

- Cover of the first edition
- Author: A. James Gregor
- Language: English
- Subjects: Marxism, Fascism
- Published: 2000
- Publisher: Yale University Press
- Media type: Print

The Faces of Janus is a book by A. James Gregor, a political scientist with a focus on fascism, published in 2000 by Yale University Press. In it, he argues that there are fundamental errors in Marxist analyses of fascism and that the political spectrum identifying the Left as progressive and the Right as reactionary was (in the words of Franklin Hugh Adler) a dishonest way of "privileging purported movements of the Left and demonizing movements of the Right".

Reviewer Harry V. Willems of the Southeast Kansas Library System writes: "Gregor [...] takes issue with 20th-century historians who make fascism and communism the opposing faces of Janus. [...] Gregor is the first to use Marxist theory systematically to bend the political spectrum from a linear to a circular form. That is, fascism and communism meld into each other. Fascism had its origins in communism, and communism exhibited facets of fascism from its inception."

In a review for the Journal of Libertarian Studies, Hunt Tooley of Austin College described Gregor's book as "an outstanding work of careful scholarship which speaks directly to issues long of interest to students of liberty."

== Sources ==
- Gregor, A. James. The Faces of Janus: Marxism and Fascism in the Twentieth Century. New Haven, Connecticut: Yale University Press, 2000. 256p. ISBN 0-300-07827-7.
