= Robert Gayre =

Scottish anthropologist (1907–1996)

(George) Robert Gair (6 August 1907 – 10 February 1996), who later assumed the surname Gayre of Gayre and Nigg, was a Scottish anthropologist who founded Mankind Quarterly, a peer-reviewed academic journal which has been described as a "cornerstone of the scientific racism establishment". An authority on heraldry, he also founded The Armorial, and published a number of books on this subject. He achieved notoriety for claiming to be the Chief of "Clan Gayre" and "Clan Gayre and Nigg", it being subsequently found that such a "clan" had never existed; according to the Glasgow Herald, Gayre created "a Scottish clan from scratch, providing it with traditions, rituals, precedences and privileges". Further, not only did he not have legitimate male-line Gair descent (his father being the illegitimate child of a working-class woman of the name of Gair), but he had falsified a pedigree, given to Burke's Peerage among others, connecting his ancestor to a minor (not chiefly) family of the name resident at Nigg. Many biographical details, such as ranks, degrees, and titles he claimed, are not independently verifiable, deriving from his own writings.

== Early life and education ==
Gayre was born as George Robert Gair on 6 August 1907 in Dublin to Robert William Gair (1875–1957), later of Sprotbrough, Doncaster, South Yorkshire, a pastry baker and confectioner, and Clara Hull or Hart. His younger brother and two sisters retained the spelling of "Gair". In bogus pedigrees recorded in Ireland in 1950 and published between 1952 and 2003, he claimed that his father was the son of portrait painter William Gillies Gair (1842–1906), but he was actually the illegitimate son of the painter's sister Jessie Gair (died 1897), both being children of Alexander Gair (1810–1884), a Greenock joiner. Jessie Gair was described on her son's birth certificate as a "fancy goods shopwoman". Two years after the child's birth, now described as a "drapery saleswoman", she became the second wife of William Sutherland, a journeyman plasterer of Glasgow, who died aged 45 at a Glasgow poorhouse. Jessie died in 1897 aged 47 at a Gourock asylum, her occupation given as "sewer".

He earned an MA from University of Edinburgh, then completed research but did not take a degree at Exeter College, Oxford. He would later also claim to have three PhDs (sometimes mentioning them to be "honorary") from Italian universities: in Political Science from the University of Palermo, in Philosophy from the University of Messina, and in Science from the University of Naples, awarded in 1943 and 1944, at which time Britain was at war with Italy.

== Military service ==
According to his own account, Gayre served as an "officer of the Regular Army Reserve" with the Royal Artillery as part of the British Expeditionary Force in France in 1939, later claiming the rank of Lieutenant-Colonel. He stated that he entered the Royal Artillery in 1931 as a second lieutenant, was promoted to lieutenant in 1934, and to captain in 1940, later being promoted to major; this progression is corroborated by the London Gazette: George Robert Gair – late an officer cadet of the University of Edinburgh Officer Training Corps – was to be a second lieutenant in the Supplementary Reserve of Officers of the Royal Regiment of Artillery from 5 August 1931; 2nd Lt G. R. Gair, of the Supplementary Reserve of Officers of the Royal Artillery, was to be lieutenant as of 5 August 1934; Lt G. R. Gayre was to be war substantive captain as of 5 August 1941; War Substantive Captain G. R. Gayre, of the Royal Artillery, was transferred to the Army Educational Corps at that same rank as of 27 January 1942; Captain (War Substantive Major) G. R. Gayre, of the Royal Army Educational Corps, was promoted to the rank of Major as of 1 January 1949. Afterwards he claimed to have been Educational Adviser to the Allied Military Government of Italy, based in Palermo, where he fought for the exclusion of left-wing text-books and communist influence from the Italian education system. He was thereafter Director of Education to the Allied Control Commission for Italy, based in Naples; and Chief of Education and Religious Affairs, German Planning Unit, Supreme Headquarters Allied Expeditionary Force. After the war he spent a considerable amount of time in India where he was instrumental in the establishment of the Italo-Indian Institute. He served as professor of anthropology at the University of Saugor from 1954 to 1956.

== Heraldry ==
Gayre was author of a number of books on heraldry. As Chief of Clan Gayre, he styled himself "of Gayre and Nigg", and became Grand Almoner, and Hereditary Commander of Lochore, of the Order of Saint Lazarus (statuted 1910).

His books on Heraldic Standards and Other Ensigns (1959) and Heraldic Cadency (1961) are considered valuable and authoritative contributions to the field, and he also contributed on the topic to the Encyclopædia Britannica.

== Mankind Quarterly and publications on race ==
Gayre was one of the founders of Mankind Quarterly and an editor from 1960 to 1978. He was honorary editor-in-chief thereafter.

The magazine has been called a "cornerstone of the scientific racism establishment" and a "white supremacist journal", "scientific racism's keepers of the flame", a journal with a "racist orientation" and an "infamous racist journal", and "journal of 'scientific racism'".

In 1968 he testified on behalf of members of the Racial Preservation Society who were charged under the Race Relations Act for publishing racialist material. They prevailed in their defence. In his evidence to the court Gayre described blacks as being "feckless" and he maintained that scientific evidence showed that blacks "prefer their leisure to the dynamism which the white and yellow races show."

== Falsified ancestry; creation of "Clan Gayre" ==
Even according to the falsified pedigree he provided to Burke's Peerage for publication, previous generations of Gayre's Gair ancestors all used the spelling "Gair" as far back as the 17th century. Gayre's university degree in the mid-1920s was likewise issued with the "Gair" spelling, but he began spelling it "Gayre" at least as early as 1943. In 1957, after the death of his father, he changed his surname to "Gayre of Gayre and Nigg", a title that had never before been used.

Gayre claimed to be the Chief of "Clan Gayre" and "Clan Gayre and Nigg". In 1947, he wrote a book titled Gayre's Booke: Being a History of the Family of Gayre, in which, without mentioning his illegitimate descent, he presented an ancestry that supposedly established his claim to be the chieftain of the Clan of Gayre; however no clan or sept by that name is mentioned in any record prior to Gayre's use of it in the second quarter of the 20th century. World Orders of Knighthood and Merit by Guy Stair Sainty (published by Burke's Peerage) refers to Gayre as "...the late Robert Gayre (first Chief of the newly formed Clan Gayre)...". The Glasgow Herald Newspaper, on 14 June 1975, wrote "Robert Gayre, of Gayre and Nigg, is singular among genealogists, dynasts and the like, if only for the reason that, alone among them, he has been able to create a Scottish clan from scratch, providing it with traditions, rituals, precedences and privileges..."

== Titles and styles ==
In the early 1960s, Gayre was appointed "Commissioner-General of the English Tongue" of the Order of Saint Lazarus, one of the many neo-chivalrous self-styled orders that arose in the early twentieth century.

In 1964, Gayre formed the International Commission on Orders of Chivalry (ICOC), an ostensibly academic but non-authoritative panel whose purpose was to review and approve of or reject claimed Orders of Chivalry. The Commission originally included many holders of legitimate titles and honours, but when it became evident that Gayre intended to bolster the legitimacy of the Order of St. Lazarus through the commission's published Register, some of the original members resigned in protest. The privately run and privately funded ICOC continued to act as a vehicle for promoting the cause of establishing the Order of St. Lazarus' legitimacy until Gayre's death in 1996. In this, he was assisted by his friend, protege, fellow member of the Order of St Lazarus, and vice-president of the ICOC Terence MacCarthy, whose pedigree has been shown to be similarly bogus.

In 1967 Gayre established a Commandery of the Order of St Lazarus. In 1971 he bought St Vincent's Church, Edinburgh. He established it as a collegiate church, and the seat of the Commandery of Lochore. It was the first church to have been acquired by the Order of St Lazarus since the Reformation. In 2018 Gayre's son gave the church back to the Vestry. The interior of the church contains many features, including shields, stained glass windows, and banners, relating to the Order.

Gayre also claimed to be "Baron of Lochoreshire". This was not a title that Gayre inherited or was bestowed but rather one that he assumed after he purchased the ruins of the castle which constituted the seat of the feudal Barony of Lochore. Nor was the feudal Barony ever previously described as "Lochoreshire"; it was always the "Barony of Lochore", which was located within an area that was known in medieval times as Lochoreshire. Other titles and honours that he said he had include being Chamberlain to the Prince of Lippe (a prominent member of the Order of Saint Lazarus), Knight of the Sacred Military Constantinian Order of Saint George of Naples, Knight Commander of the Cross of Merit (Military Division) of the Sovereign Military Order of Malta, Knight Commander of the House Order of Lippe, Knight Grand Cross with Collar of the Military and Hospitaller Order of St. Lazarus of Jerusalem and Knight Grand Officer of the Order of the Crown of Italy.

== Nazi ties ==
In 1944 Gayre wrote Teuton and Slav on the Polish frontier: a diagnosis of the racial basis of the Germano-Polish borderlands, with suggestions for the settlement of German and Slav claims using photos by the Nazi Hans F. K. Günther and refers several times to "Professor Hans F. K. Günther's authoritative work on German racial science". Like Günther, he was a leading member of the post-war Neo-Nazi Northern League and according to Joseph L. Graves and others had close ties to other neo-Nazi organisations. Graves and William H. Tucker state that Gayre considered himself a Strasserist, an ideology "which emphasized the 'socialism' in National Socialism, rejecting both communism and capitalism as Jewish-dominated systems that had to be overthrown in favour of an approach based on white racial solidarity." He denied any links between Nazism and Mankind Quarterly while lamenting the identification by most of the word "Nazi" with "Hitlerian Nazi".

== Publications on ancient Zimbabwe ==
Gayre wrote some articles and a book proposing a Semitic origin for Great Zimbabwe, maintaining that the Lemba are descended through their male line from the creators of the original Zimbabwean civilisation, and citing evidence including burial and circumcision practices. He suggested that the Shona artefacts which were found at Great Zimbabwe and in numerous other stone ruins nearby, were placed there only after they conquered the country and drove out or absorbed the previous inhabitants; he added that the ones who remained would probably have passed some of their skills and knowledge to the invaders.

According to Gayre, the agricultural terracing and irrigation channels in the Nyanga District of northeast of Zimbabwe was a product of the same ancient civilisation – as too were the hundreds of ancient gold mines in the country.

Most archaeologists disagree with Gayre's interpretation and conclusions: they maintain that Great Zimbabwe was constructed by ancestors of the Shona, as were the terraces, furrows and settlements of ancient Nyanga.

== Selected publications ==
- Teuton and Slav on the Polish Frontier: a diagnosis of the racial basis of the Germano-Polish borderlands, with suggestions for the settlement of German and Slav claims. London: Eyre and Spottiswoode. 1944.
- A New Interpretation of the Blood-Groups Phenomena in relation to Ethnology. Messina: Accademia Peloritana dei Pericolanti. 1944.
- Italy in Transition: Extracts from the private journal of G. R. Gayre. London: Faber and Faber. 1946.
- Gayre's Booke: being a History of the Family of Gayre. London: Phillimore. 1948–1959.; with Richard Leslie Gair (4 vols)
- Wassail! In Mazers of Mead: An Account of Mead, Metheglin, Sack and Other Ancient Liquors, and of the mazer cups out of which they were drunk, with some comment upon the drinking customs of our forebears. London: Phillimore. 1948.
- Common Herbs as Grown in the Hortyards at Gulval and their Uses. Gulval, Cornwall: Mead Makers. 1950.
- The Heraldry of the Knights of St John. Allahabad: Garga Bros. 1956.
- Heraldic Standards and Other Ensigns: their development and history. Edinburgh: Oliver and Boyd. 1959.
- The House of Gayre and an account of Minard Castle. Edinburgh: The Armorial. 1960.
- The Nature of Arms: An Exposition of the Meaning and Significance of Heraldry, with special reference to its nobiliary aspects. Edinburgh: Oliver and Boyd. 1961.
- Heraldic Cadency: the development of differencing of coats of arms for kinsmen and other purposes. London: Faber and Faber. 1961.
- A Case for Monarchy: a plea for the maintenance and the restoration of monarchy with particular reference to the House of Savoy. Edinburgh: The Armorial. 1962.
- The Bantu Homelands of the Northern Transvaal. Edinburgh: Mankind Quarterly. 1962.
- Who is Who in Clan Gayre: an authoritative account of the clan council, its members, the armigerous gentry of the clan, their arms and biographies. Edinburgh: The Armorial. 1962.
- Roll of Scottish Arms. Edinburgh: The Armorial. 1964–1969.; with Reinold Gayre (2 vols)
- Ethnological Elements of Africa. Edinburgh: The Armorial. 1966.
- The Origin of the Zimbabwean Civilisation. [Salisbury, Rhodesia: Galaxie Press. 1972.; with E. Layland
- More Ethnological Elements of Africa. Edinburgh: The Armorial. 1972.
- Miscellaneous Racial Studies, 1943–1972. Edinburgh: The Armorial. 1972. ISBN 0900077034. (2 vols)
- The Knightly Twilight: a glimpse at the chivalric and nobiliary underworld. Valletta: Union Press. 1973.
- Some Aspects of British and Continental Heraldry. Edinburgh: Lochore Enterprises. 1974.
- The Lost Clan: Sant Andrea degli Scozzesi of Gurro, Novara, Italy. Edinburgh: The Armorial. 1974. ISBN 9780900077074.
- Gayre of Gayre & Nigg: an autobiography. Edinburgh: Edinburgh Impressions. 1987. ISBN 9780951009932.
