= Robert E. Kuttner =

American biologist and white supremacist (1927–1987)

- Born: 10 March 1927; Queens, New York
- Died: 19 February 1987 (aged 59)
- Occupations: Biologist, white supremacist

Robert E. Kuttner (March 10, 1927 – February 19, 1987) was an American biologist and white supremacist.

== Biography ==
Kuttner was born in Queens, New York. He obtained a Ph.D. in zoology from the University of Connecticut. He was an initial director of the International Association for the Advancement of Ethnology and Eugenics and was contributor and associate editor to Charles Lee Smith's Truth Seeker.

Kuttner opposed miscegenation and believed it was "unnatural", only found amongst zoo animals. He described his own position as "scientific racism". He identified as a Nordicist and argued against racial equality. Kuttner stated that Negroes were racially inferior, they had failed to build and create civilization and they lacked intelligence. He testified in Congress to oppose school integration. Anthropologist Robert Sussman described Kuttner as a "lifelong neo-Nazi".

Kuttner collaborated on racial ideas about "biopolitics" with Eustace Mullins. He wrote for Roger Pearson's Northern World, the floundering The American Mercury and was an editor of the Mankind Quarterly. He edited the essay collection Race and Modern Science in response to the 1967 document Statement on Race and Racial Prejudice issued by UNESCO. Race and Modern Science was negatively reviewed by Sherwood Washburn, who described it as a "useful source book for racists. Anthropologists need not bother with it."

== Selected publications ==
- Kuttner, Robert E. (ed.) Race and Modern Science. New York: Social Science Press, 1967.
