= Donald A. Swan =

American anthropologist (1935–1981)

Donald A. Swan (28 March 1935 – June 1981) was an American anthropologist and advocate for eugenics and segregation.

== Early life ==
Donald A. Swan was born on 28 March 1935.

He got a degree from Queens College. He studied economics in graduate school at Columbia University but was expelled for stealing books from the library. He wrote a letter in appreciation to Karl Donitz, the successor to Adolf Hitler.

== Career ==
Swan was an assistant professor at the University of Southern Mississippi. He was a co-founder in 1959 of the International Association for the Advancement of Ethnology and Eugenics (IAAEE), serving as treasurer and corresponding secretary, and he was involved in the Northern League. He was involved in the IAAEE's attempts to overturn Brown v. Board of Education. In the 1950s he contributed articles to The Truth Seeker purporting genetic differences based on early 20th century IQ studies and Nazi anthropology. He made speeches using the pseudonym Thor Swenson. He was a defender of the German eugenicist Hans F. K. Günther.

In 1966, Swan was arrested on mail-fraud charges. During the raid on Swan's apartment in Queens, New York, the police found Nazi memorabilia, weapons and ammunition. A book by George Lincoln Rockwell of the American Nazi Party was also found, as well as a photograph depicting Swan with American Nazi Party members. He and a colleague were later convicted of 12 counts of mail fraud and conspiracy to commit mail fraud.

== Death and legacy ==
Swan died in June 1981. After his death, Swan's papers were purchased and donated to Roger Pearson at the Institute for the Study of Man, under a Pioneer Fund grant of $59,000.
