= Canadian Journal of History =

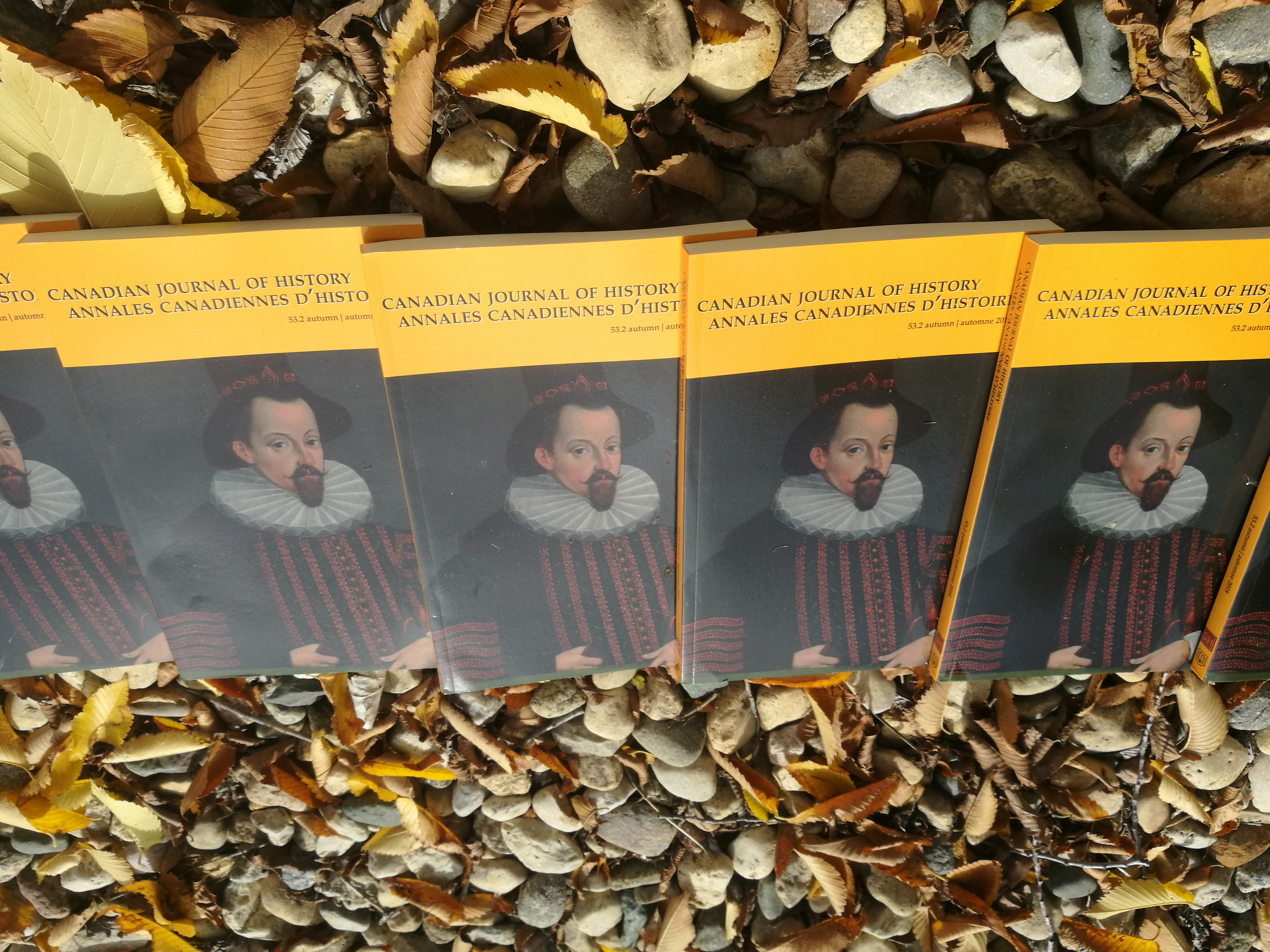
- Discipline: History
- Language: English, French

Publication details
- History: 1966-present
- Publisher: University of Toronto Press (Canada)
- Frequency: Triannually

Standard abbreviations
- ISO 4: Can. J. Hist.

Indexing
- ISSN: 0008-4107 (print); 2292-8502 (web)
- LCCN: 66009904
- OCLC no.: 1080675917

Links
- Journal homepage

The Canadian Journal of History/Annales canadiennes d'histoire is a triannual peer-reviewed academic journal covering all areas of history. It was established in 1966 at the University of Saskatchewan and was acquired by University of Toronto Press in 2019. It is abstracted and indexed in Historical Abstracts, America: History and Life, and Scopus. Articles are published in English or French.
