= Mankind Quarterly =

Pseudo-scientific white supremacist journal

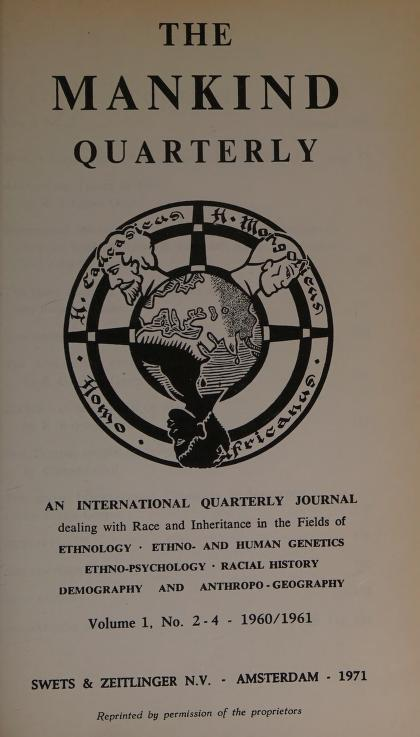
- Title page of a 1971 reprint of Volume 1, No. 2-4 (1960/1961). The emblem splits humanity into different "species": Caucasoids, Mongoloids, and Negroids.
- Discipline: Anthropology
- Language: English

Publication details
- History: 1960–present
- Publisher: Human Diversity Foundation
- Frequency: Quarterly

Standard abbreviations
- ISO 4: Mank. Q.

Indexing
- CODEN: MKQUA4
- ISSN: 0025-2344
- LCCN: 63024971
- OCLC no.: 820324

Links
- Journal homepage

Mankind Quarterly Monographs
- Discipline: Anthropology
- Language: English

Publication details
- Publisher: Human Diversity Foundation

Standard abbreviations
- ISO 4: Mank. Q. Monogr.

Indexing
- CODEN: MAQUE6
- ISSN: 0893-4649
- LCCN: sf89030002
- OCLC no.: 149980257

Mankind Quarterly is a pseudoscientific journal that covers physical and cultural anthropology, including human evolution, intelligence, ethnography, linguistics, mythology, archaeology, and biology. It has been described as a "cornerstone of the scientific racism establishment", a "white supremacist journal", and "a pseudo-scholarly outlet for promoting racial inequality". As of 2024, Mankind Quarterly is published by the white nationalist Human Diversity Foundation.

== History ==
The journal was established in 1960 with funding from segregationists, who designed it to serve as a mouthpiece for their views. The costs of initially launching the journal were paid by the Pioneer Fund's Wickliffe Draper. The founders were Robert Gayre, Henry Garrett, Roger Pearson, Corrado Gini, Luigi Gedda (Honorary Advisory Board), Otmar von Verschuer and Reginald Ruggles Gates. Another early editor was Herbert Charles Sanborn, formerly the chair of the department of Philosophy and Psychology at Vanderbilt University from 1921 to 1942. It was originally published in Edinburgh, Scotland, by the International Association for the Advancement of Ethnology and Eugenics, an organization founded by Draper to promote eugenics and scientific racism.

Its foundation was a response to the declaration by UNESCO, which dismissed the validity of race as a biological concept, and to attempts to end racial segregation in the American South.

In 1961, physical anthropologist Juan Comas published a series of scathing critiques of the journal arguing that the journal was reproducing discredited racial ideologies, such as Nordicism and anti-Semitism, under the guise of science. In 1963, after the journal's first issue, contributors U. R. Ehrenfels, T. N. Madan, and Juan Comas said that the journal's editorial practice was biased and misleading. In response, the journal published a series of rebuttals and attacks on Comas. Comas argued in Current Anthropology that the journal's publication of A. James Gregor's review of Comas' book Racial Myths was politically motivated. Comas claimed the journal misrepresented the field of physical anthropology by adhering to outdated racial ideologies, for example by claiming that Jews were considered a "biological race" by the racial biologists of the time. Other anthropologists complained that paragraphs that did not agree with the racial ideology of the editorial board were deleted from published articles without the authors' agreement.

Few academic anthropologists would publish in the journal or serve on its board; when Gates died, Carleton S. Coon, an anthropologist sympathetic to the hereditarian and racialistic view of the journal, was asked to replace him, but he rejected the offer stating that "I fear that for a professional anthropologist to accept membership on your board would be the kiss of death". The journal continued to be published supported by grant money. Publisher Roger Pearson received over a million dollars in grants from the Pioneer Fund in the 1980s and 1990s.

During the "Bell Curve wars" of the 1990s, the journal received attention when opponents of The Bell Curve publicised the fact that some of the works cited by Bell Curve authors Richard Herrnstein and Charles Murray had first been published in Mankind Quarterly. In The New York Review of Books, Charles Lane referred to The Bell Curve's "tainted sources", that seventeen researchers cited in the book's bibliography had contributed articles to, and ten of these seventeen had also been editors of, Mankind Quarterly, "a notorious journal of 'racial history' founded, and funded, by men who believe in the genetic superiority of the white race."

The journal was published by the Ulster Institute for Social Research from January 2015, when publication duties were transferred from (Roger) Pearson's Council for Social and Economic Studies (which had published the journal since 1979). As of 2024, Mankind Quarterly is published by the white nationalist Human Diversity Foundation.

== Editors ==
As of 2023 the editor-in-chief was Gerhard Meisenberg. Previous editors include Roger Pearson, Edward Dutton, and Richard Lynn.

== Publisher ==
The Mankind Quarterly was published by the Ulster Institute for Social Research, which was presided over by Richard Lynn until his death in 2023.

As of 2024, Mankind Quarterly is published by the white nationalist Human Diversity Foundation founded by Danish far-right activist Emil Kirkegaard. The Foundation also publishes the Aporia Magazine.

Emil Kirkegaard, a white supremacist and founder of the OpenPsych journal, was the registrant of the Mankind Quarterly website between 2017 and February 2023, after which the WHOIS was anonymised. In February 2024, Kirkegaard filed his Mankind Publishing House LLC with the state of Wyoming under the name of William Engman (his legal name since 2021).

== Reception ==
Mankind Quarterly has been described as a "cornerstone of the scientific racism establishment", a "white supremacist journal", an "infamous racist journal", and "scientific racism's keepers of the flame". The journal has been criticised as being both overtly political and strongly right-leaning, supporting eugenics, racist or fascist.

== Abstracting and indexing ==
The journal is abstracted and indexed in:

- ATLA Religion Database
- International Bibliography of the Social Sciences
- Linguistics & Language Behavior Abstracts
- Modern Language Association Database
- Scopus

== See also ==
- Intelligence (journal)
- Journal of Historical Review
- Journal of Social, Political, and Economic Studies
- Neue Anthropologie
- The Occidental Quarterly
- OpenPsych
- Psych (journal)
