= International Association for the Advancement of Ethnology and Eugenics =

Pro-segregation eugenics group

The International Association for the Advancement of Ethnology and Eugenics (IAAEE) was an organisation that promoted eugenics and segregation, and the first publisher of Mankind Quarterly.

== History ==
IAAEE was founded in 1959 and has headquarters in Edinburgh, Scotland. According to Russ Bellant, it was later also incorporated in the United States through the personal agency of Lord Malcolm Douglas-Hamilton, a member of the British Cliveden Set which supported appeasement of Adolf Hitler prior to World War II.

A. James Gregor was a founding director of the IAAEE which was, according to Gregor, established to restore "an intellectual climate in the U.S., and throughout the Western World, which would permit a free and open discussion of racial ... problems." Henry E. Garrett, professor emeritus of psychology from Columbia University, was president of the IAAEE and one of the editors of Mankind Quarterly which was published by IAAEE.

Drawing on arguments presented by Gregor, members of the organization including Garrett and Donald A. Swan worked to oppose school integration following Brown v. Board of Education, arguing that racism was "rooted in normal social behavior" and that protecting Black children from supposed harm stemming from contact with white people would make for a more morally persuasive defense of segregation. Gregor would later assert that his association with the organization was based on his concerns about congenital birth defects and the reproduction of the mentally retarded, as opposed to racial matters. Other members included Senator Jesse Helms and the oil billionaires William Herbert and Nelson Bunker Hunt.

The IAAEE's main benefactor was Colonel Wickliffe Draper, a segregationist who opposed the civil rights movement of the 1960s and sought to fund research that would provide scientific justification for segregation and revive the concept of racial hygiene which had been discredited as a result of the Nazis. In the 1970s Gregor was criticised for accepting grants from the Pioneer Fund which had been established by Draper to advance his views. IAAEE received $82,000 in grants from the Pioneer Fund between 1971 and 1996.

In the 1960s, Stanley Porteus served on the executive committee of the IAAEE. Other key figures included Robert E. Kuttner, a zoologist with ties to Nazi and neo-Nazi groups.

== Publications ==
The group published a series of monographs that were cited in many papers on race and intelligence.

Charles Murray and Richard J. Herrnstein recommend in their book The Bell Curve two books on race and intelligence by Audrey Shuey and Frank C. J. McGurk, who were leading members of the IAAEE, in support for the argument that IQ tests are not racially biased.
