= ML-SI3 =

Chemical compound

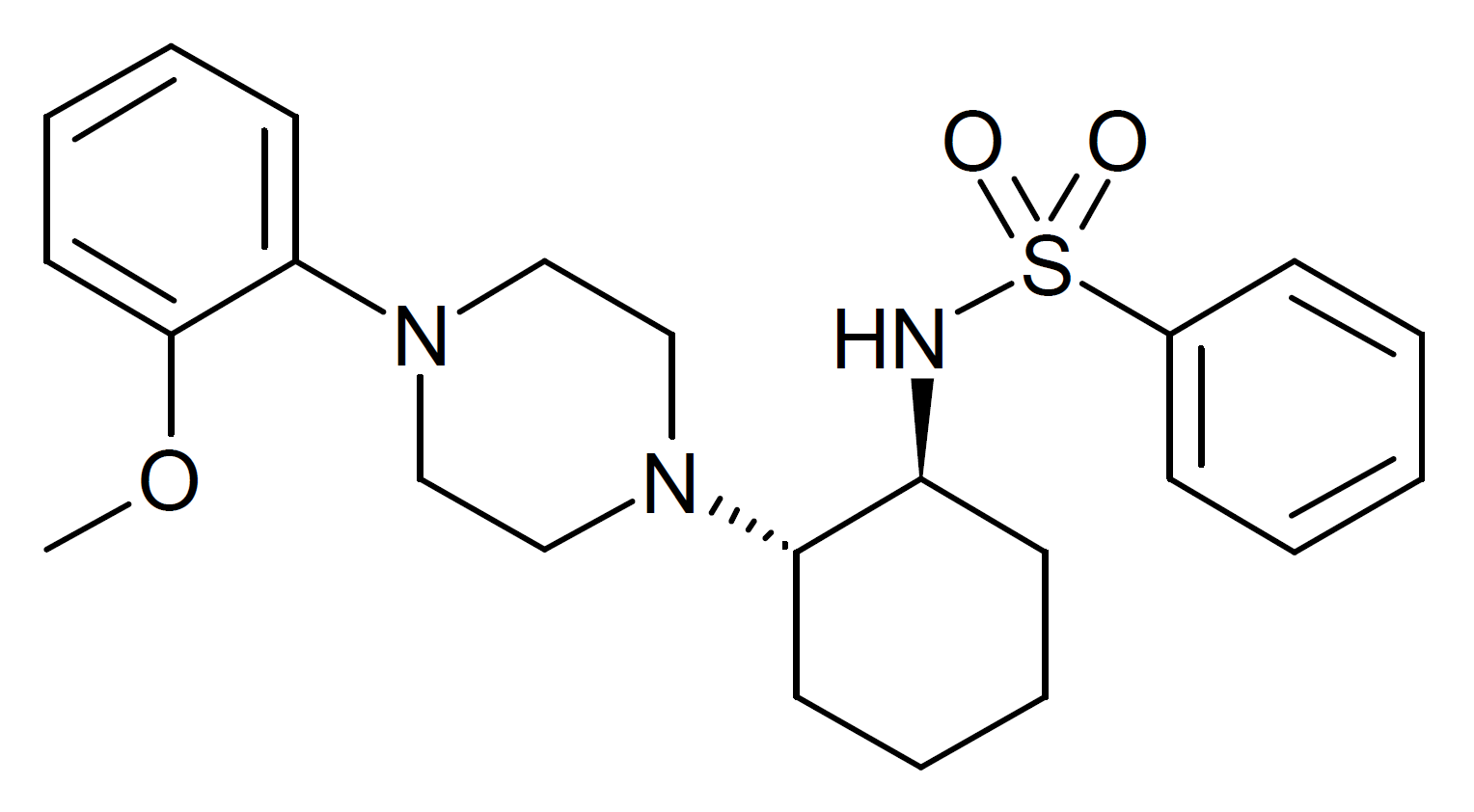

Identifiers
- IUPAC name: N-[(1S,2S)-2-[4-(2-methoxyphenyl)piperazin-1-yl]cyclohexyl]benzenesulfonamide
- CAS Number: 891016-02-7
- PubChem CID: 94784693
- ChemSpider: 20304221
- CompTox Dashboard (EPA): DTXSID801336630

Chemical and physical data
- Formula: C_{23}H_{31}N_{3}O_{3}S
- Molar mass: 429.58 g·mol^{−1}
- 3D model (JSmol): Interactive image
- SMILES: COC1=CC=CC=C1N2CCN(CC2)[C@H]3CCCC[C@@H]3NS(=O)(=O)C4=CC=CC=C4
- InChI: InChI=1S/C23H31N3O3S/c1-29-23-14-8-7-13-22(23)26-17-15-25(16-18-26)21-12-6-5-11-20(21)24-30(27,28)19-9-3-2-4-10-19/h2-4,7-10,13-14,20-21,24H,5-6,11-12,15-18H2,1H3/t20-,21-/m0/s1; Key:OVTXOMMQHRIKGL-SFTDATJTSA-N

ML-SI3 is a chemical compound which acts as an "antagonist" (i.e. channel blocker) of the TRPML family of calcium channels, with greatest activity at the TRPML1 channel, although it also blocks the related TRPML2 and TRPML3 channels with lower affinity. It is used for research into the role of TRPML1 and its various functions in lysosomes and elsewhere in the body.

== See also ==
- MK6-83
