= MK6-83 =

Chemical compound

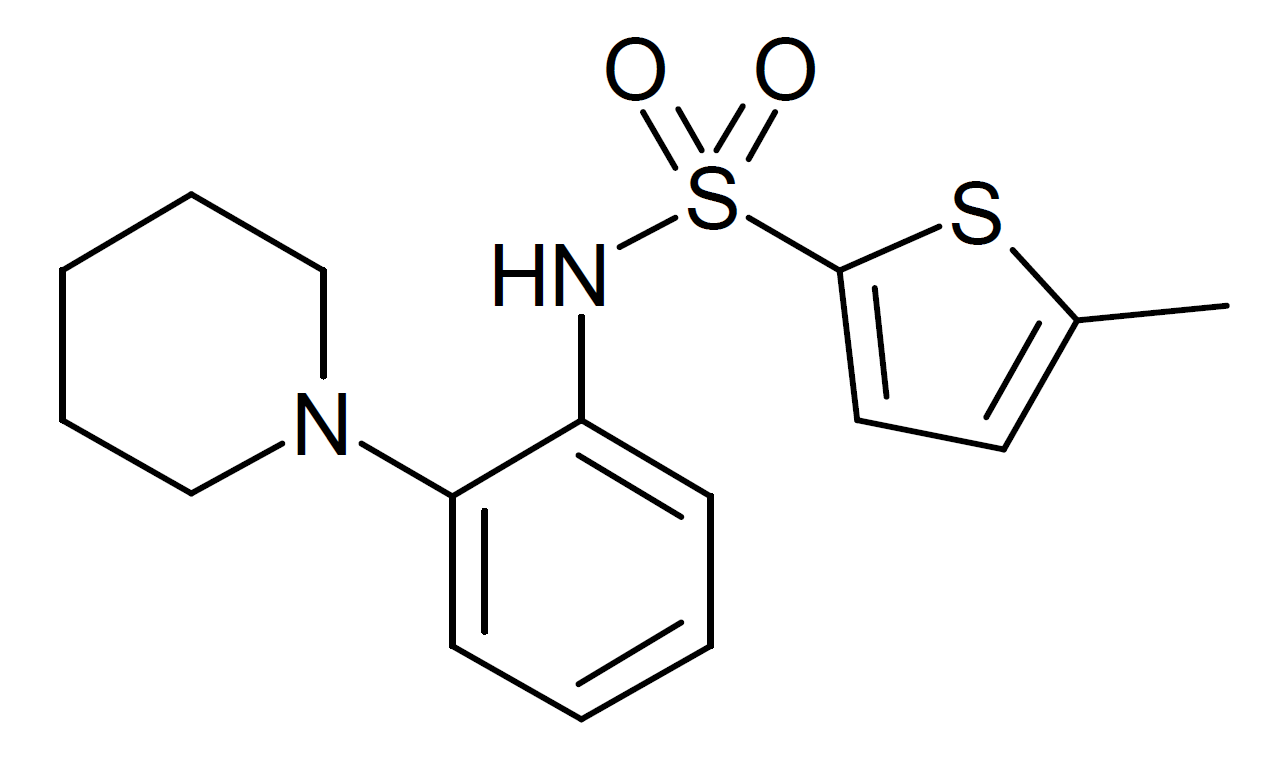

Identifiers
- IUPAC name: 5-methyl-N-[2-(piperidin-1-yl)phenyl]thiophene-2-sulfonamide
- CAS Number: 1062271-24-2
- PubChem CID: 18191179
- ChemSpider: 17030252
- UNII: RE9JUR6NT4
- CompTox Dashboard (EPA): DTXSID501336629

Chemical and physical data
- Formula: C_{16}H_{20}N_{2}O_{2}S_{2}
- Molar mass: 336.47 g·mol^{−1}
- 3D model (JSmol): Interactive image
- SMILES: CC1=CC=C(S1)S(=O)(=O)NC2=CC=CC=C2N3CCCCC3
- InChI: InChI=1S/C16H20N2O2S2/c1-13-9-10-16(21-13)22(19,20)17-14-7-3-4-8-15(14)18-11-5-2-6-12-18/h3-4,7-10,17H,2,5-6,11-12H2,1H3; Key:IRGYSXZCDAWOOC-UHFFFAOYSA-N

MK6-83 is a chemical compound which acts as a channel opener for the TRPML family of calcium channels, with moderate selectivity for TRPML1 over the related TRPML2 and TRPML3 subtypes.

== See also ==
- ML-SI3
- ML2-SA1
- SN-2
