= ML2-SA1 =

Chemical compound

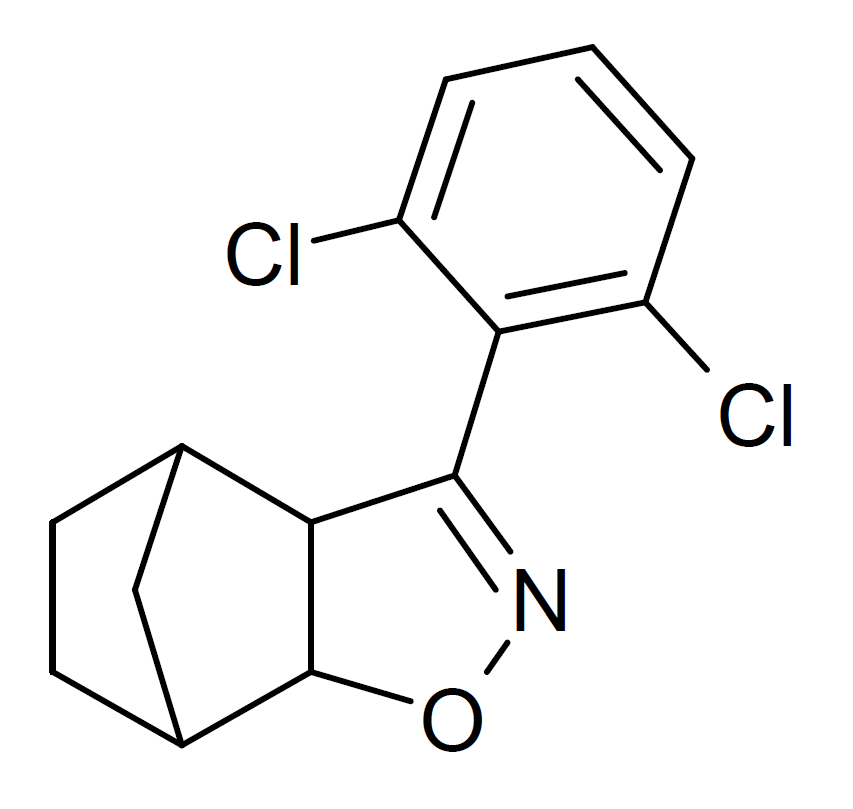

Identifiers
- IUPAC name: 5-(2,6-dichlorophenyl)-3-oxa-4-azatricyclo[5.2.1.0^{2,6}]dec-4-ene
- CAS Number: 2349386-89-4
- PubChem CID: 137553170
- IUPHAR/BPS: 10301
- ChemSpider: 84400411
- UNII: 9Y7K335ZQY
- CompTox Dashboard (EPA): DTXSID201336632

Chemical and physical data
- Formula: C_{14}H_{13}Cl_{2}NO
- Molar mass: 282.16 g·mol^{−1}
- 3D model (JSmol): Interactive image
- SMILES: Clc4cccc(Cl)c4C3=NOC2C1CC(CC1)C23
- InChI: InChI=1S/C14H13Cl2NO/c15-9-2-1-3-10(16)12(9)13-11-7-4-5-8(6-7)14(11)18-17-13/h1-3,7-8,11,14H,4-6H2; Key:NBXVMFMMTKYFQP-UHFFFAOYSA-N

ML2-SA1 (EVP-22) is a chemical compound which acts as an "agonist" (i.e. channel opener) for the TRPML2 calcium channel, with high selectivity for TRPML2 and no significant activity at the related TRPML1 and TRPML3 channels. It has been used to demonstrate the role of TRPM2 in immune system function, both triggering release of the chemokine CCL2 from macrophages and stimulating macrophage migration and endolysosomal trafficking.

== See also ==
- MK6-83
- SN-2
