= A Troublesome Inheritance =

2014 book by Nicholas Wade

A Troublesome Inheritance: Genes, Race and Human History
- Author: Nicholas Wade
- Language: English
- Subjects: Race; Human evolution
- Published: 2014
- Publisher: Penguin Books
- Publication place: United States
- Media type: Print
- ISBN: 978-1-59420-446-3

A Troublesome Inheritance: Genes, Race and Human History is a 2014 book by Nicholas Wade, a British writer, journalist, and former science and health editor for The New York Times. In the book, Wade argues that human evolution has been "recent, copious and regional" and that this has important implications for social sciences. The book has been widely denounced by the scientific community for misrepresenting research into human population genetics.

== Synopsis ==
Wade writes about racial differences in economic success between Whites, Blacks, and East Asians, and offers the argument that racial differences come from genetic differences amplified by culture. In the first part of the book, Wade provides an account of human genetics research. In the second part of his book, Wade proposes that regional differences in evolution of social behavior explain many differences among different human societies around the world.

== Reception ==
The book has been widely denounced by scientists, including many of those whose work is cited in the book itself. On 8 August 2014, The New York Times Book Review published an open letter signed by 139 senior faculty members in population genetics and evolutionary biology which read:

Wade juxtaposes an incomplete and inaccurate account of our research on human genetic differences with speculation that recent natural selection has led to worldwide differences in I.Q. test results, political institutions and economic development. We reject Wade's implication that our findings substantiate his guesswork. They do not.

We are in full agreement that there is no support from the field of population genetics for Wade's conjectures.

After publication, the letter was signed by four more faculty members. In reply, Wade wrote, "This letter is driven by politics, not science. I am confident that most of the signatories have not read my book and are responding to a slanted summary devised by the organizers." Wade added that he had asked the letter's main authors, Graham Coop and Michael Eisen, for a list of errors so that he could correct future editions of the book.

Evolutionary geneticist Mark Jobling, one of the signatories to the letter, wrote an opinion piece in the peer-reviewed journal Investigative Genetics explaining that the unprecedented letter was necessary due to both the fallacious nature of Wade's argument and its political ramifications, stating that "Its enthusiastic proponents already include some high profile white supremacists and a former Grand Wizard of the Ku Klux Klan." Biologist Marcus Feldman, another of the signatories to the letter, further criticized Wade's book, arguing that "By invoking Richard Lynn on racial variation in IQ and wealth, Wade departs from his 'speculative arena,' leaving us to infer not only that he is a devout hereditarian, but also that he is comfortable with Lynn's racist worldview."

The book was further criticized in a series of five reviews by Agustín Fuentes, Jonathan M. Marks, Jennifer Raff, Charles C. Roseman and Laura R. Stein, which were published together in the scientific journal Human Biology. Marks, for instance, described the book as "entirely derivative, an argument made from selective citations, misrepresentations, and speculative pseudoscience." The publishers made all the reviews accessible on open access in order to facilitate discussions on the subject.

Anthropologist Greg Laden writes that anthropologists were mostly critical of the book, while psychologists and economists generally received it more warmly. Laden concludes that "A Troublesome Inheritance is itself troubling, not for its politics but for its science. Its arguments are only mildly amended versions of arguments discarded decades ago by those who methodically and systematically study human behavioral variation across cultures."

Evolutionary biologist H. Allen Orr wrote in The New York Review of Books that "Wade's survey of human population genomics is lively and generally serviceable. It is not, however, without error. He exaggerates, for example, the percentage of the human genome that shows evidence of recent natural selection." Orr comments that, in its second part, "the book resembles a heavily biological version of Francis Fukuyama's claims about the effect of social institutions on the fates of states in his The Origins of Political Order (2011)." Orr criticizes Wade for failing to provide sufficient evidence for his claims, though according to Orr, Wade concedes that evidence for his thesis is "nearly nonexistent."

Political scientist Charles Murray, co-author of the 1994 book The Bell Curve, wrote a positive review in The Wall Street Journal, calling the book "historic" and stating that opposition to the book among academics would be motivated by "political correctness". Economist Walter E. Block criticized parts of the book, but concluded Wade's "moral and intellectual courage cannot be denied". Statistician Andrew Gelman writes, "As a statistician and political scientist, I see naivete in Wade's quickness to assume a genetic association for any change in social behavior."

== See also ==
- Superior: The Return of Race Science
- The 10,000 Year Explosion: How Civilization Accelerated Human Evolution
