= ML-SA1 =

Chemical compound

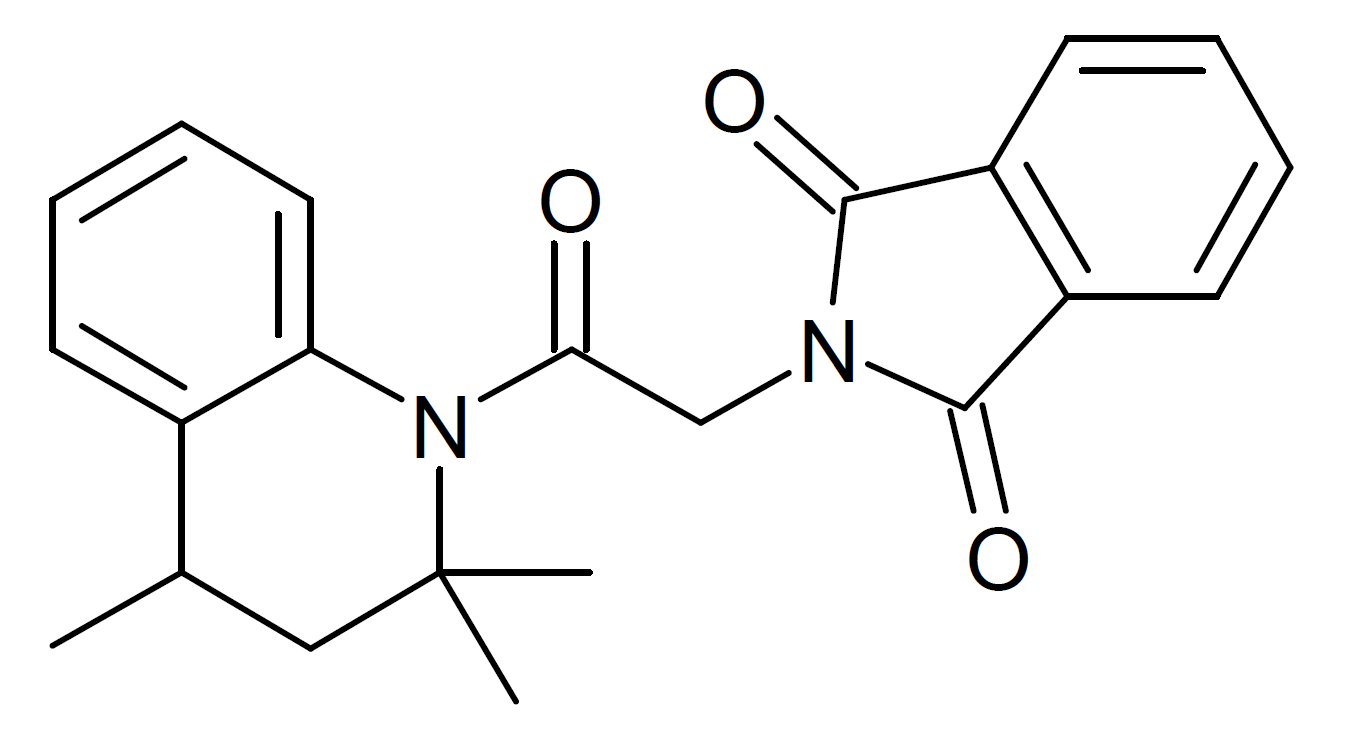

Identifiers
- IUPAC name: 2-[2-oxo-2-(2,2,4-trimethyl-3,4-dihydroquinolin-1-yl)ethyl]isoindole-1,3-dione
- CAS Number: 332382-54-4
- PubChem CID: 2880983
- ChemSpider: 2155576
- ChEMBL: ChEMBL1527280
- CompTox Dashboard (EPA): DTXSID801336628

Chemical and physical data
- Formula: C_{22}H_{22}N_{2}O_{3}
- Molar mass: 362.429 g·mol^{−1}
- 3D model (JSmol): Interactive image
- SMILES: CC1CC(N(C2=CC=CC=C12)C(=O)CN3C(=O)C4=CC=CC=C4C3=O)(C)C
- InChI: InChI=1S/C22H22N2O3/c1-14-12-22(2,3)24(18-11-7-6-8-15(14)18)19(25)13-23-20(26)16-9-4-5-10-17(16)21(23)27/h4-11,14H,12-13H2,1-3H3; Key:KDDHBJICVBONAX-UHFFFAOYSA-N

ML-SA1 is a chemical compound which acts as an "agonist" (i.e. channel opener) of the TRPML family of calcium channels. It has mainly been studied for its role in activating TRPML1 channels, although it also shows activity at the less studied TRPML2 and TRPML3 subtypes. TRPML1 is important for the function of lysosomes, and ML-SA1 has been used to study several disorders resulting from impaired lysosome function, including mucolipidosis type IV and Niemann-Pick's disease type C, as well as other conditions such as stroke and Alzheimer's disease.
