= Before the Dawn (Wade book) =

2006 book by Nicholas Wade

Before the Dawn: Recovering the Lost History of Our Ancestors
- Author: Nicholas Wade
- Language: English
- Subject: Human evolution
- Publisher: Penguin Group
- Publication date: 2006 (first edition, hardcover); 2007 (updated edition, paperback)
- Publication place: United States
- Media type: Print (Hardcover and Paperback)
- ISBN: 1-59420-079-3 (hardcover); ISBN 978-0-14-303832-0 (paperback)
- Dewey Decimal: 599.93'8-dc22
- LC Class: GN281.W33 2006

Before the Dawn: Recovering the Lost History of Our Ancestors is a non-fiction book by Nicholas Wade, a science reporter for The New York Times. It was published in 2006 by the Penguin Group. By drawing upon research on the human genome, the book attempts to piece together what Wade calls "two vanished periods": the five million years of human evolution from the development of bipedalism leading up to behavioural modernity around 50,000 years ago, and the 45,000 subsequent years of prehistory.

Wade asserts that there is a clear continuity from the earlier apes of five million years ago to the anatomically modern humans who diverged from them, citing the genetic and social similarities between humans and chimpanzees. He attributes the divergence of the two species from a common ancestor to a change in their ecological niche; the ancestors of chimpanzees remained in the forests of equatorial Africa, whereas the ancestors of humans moved to open woodland and were exposed to different evolutionary pressures. Although Wade posits that much of human evolution can be attributed to the physical environment, he also believes that one of the major forces shaping evolution has been the nature of human society itself.

After humans migrated out of their ancestral environment of eastern Africa, they were exposed to new climates and challenges. Thus, Wade argues, human evolution did not end with behavioural modernity, but continued to be shaped by the different environments and lifestyles of each continent. While many adaptations happened in parallel across human populations, Wade believes that genetic isolation – either because of geography or hostile tribalism – also facilitated a degree of independent evolution, leading to genetic and cultural differentiation from the ancestral population and giving rise to different human races and languages.

The book received generally positive reviews, with the main criticisms centering on the work's use of the value-laden terminology of "race" over other, more neutral alternatives. In 2007, it won the Science in Society Journalism Award from the National Association of Science Writers.

== Summary ==
Nicholas Wade divides Before the Dawn into twelve chapters, which are roughly in the chronological order of the human past. The first chapter, Genetics & Genesis, gives a general overview of the themes that are explored in the book. The central theme is that the human genome provides a record of the human past, including what Wade calls the "two vanished periods" of human evolution and prehistory. Through information from the human genome, Wade proclaims, it is possible to determine when humans lost their body hair and began to wear clothes, to track their migration out of Africa, to discover if they interbred with Neanderthals, and even to reconstruct the evolution of language.

=== Origin of humans and language ===
The second chapter, Metamorphosis, focuses on the evolutionary origins of humans around 5 million years ago in equatorial Africa. Wade suggests that the last common ancestor of humans and chimpanzees lived in forests. Some of them, due to a global climate change between 5 and 10 million years ago, left the shrinking forests and moved to open woodland, and this new ecological niche gave rise to the human lineage. A change in food availability led to an adaptation for the ability to eat meat, and this nutrition facilitated the evolution of a larger brain. The knuckle-walking of the common ancestor gave way to bipedalism, which is more efficient over longer distances. A larger brain in combination with freed-up hands culminated in the evolution of Homo habilis and the first use of tools around 2.5 million years ago, and the more humanlike and larger brained Homo ergaster about 1.7 million years ago. The adaptations of H. ergaster to hot, dry climates included an external nose to condense air and minimise water loss, and the loss of body hair to allow sweating to cool the body and larger brain. Wade writes that a mutation in the melanocortin receptor gene created an advantageous darkening of the pale, hairless skin. The close descendants of H. ergaster, Homo erectus and Homo heidelbergensis, migrated out of Africa and to Asia (around 1 to 1.66 million years ago) and Europe (around 500,000 years ago), respectively. In Europe, the glacial conditions around 300,000 to 400,000 years ago pressured H. heidelbergensis to evolve into Neanderthals.

The human lineage that remained in Africa eventually evolved into anatomically modern humans with modern-sized brains by about 200,000 years ago, and became common about 100,000 years ago, but did not become behaviourally modern until about 50,000 years ago. Citing the paleoanthropologist Richard Klein, Wade posits that such a great change must have been because of a neurological change, and was therefore genetic. This "genetic revolution", as Wade calls it, facilitated the emergence of language and thus the ability to share thoughts and innovations. Wade discusses the evolutionary origins of language in chapter three, First Words. He references Noam Chomsky's theory of "universal grammar" – which refers to both the hard-wiring of the brain that allows children to learn grammatical rules, and the underlying grammatical similarities of all human languages. Wade cites a number of evolutionary psychologists for an explanation, including Robin Dunbar, who argues that language evolved because it was a more efficient way of establishing social bonds than grooming; Geoffrey Miller, who suggests that speech was a signal of intelligence and thus evolved through sexual selection; and Steven Pinker, who thinks that the ecological niche of humans required the sharing of knowledge. Wade writes that the genetic basis of language is linked to the FOXP2 gene, as it shows signs of significant change in humans but not in chimpanzees, and that mutations of it cause severe speech disorders.

=== Ancestral humans and migration out of Africa ===
Chapter four, Eden, discusses the ancestral population of modern humans in Africa. Through the Y chromosome and mitochondrial DNA, Wade gives evidence to suggest that the ancestral population was no more than 5,000 to 10,000 individuals in an area corresponding to what is now Ethiopia. He supposes that the small population would have lived in close proximity, and likely spoke the same language. By looking at the click languages of the genetically "ancient" Khoisan peoples, and the fact that clicks are more often lost than gained in languages, Wade suggests that clicks were present in this ancestral language. To understand the nature of the ancestral population, Donald Brown's theory of "universal people" is raised; that is, the shared behaviours of all modern human societies. A small minority of this ancestral population, Wade continues in chapter five, Exodus, crossed the Gate of Grief and left Africa 50,000 years ago, following the coasts of India and the former continents of Sunda and Sahul. As they moved into the interior of Eurasia, they clashed with H. erectus and Neanderthals, eventually pushing them into refuges and ultimately to their extinction.

The wide dispersal of humans across varying environments with different evolutionary pressures, Wade contends, began to give rise to regional differentiation. He gives examples of variation in two genes related to brain development: an allele of microcephalin that appeared about 37,000 years ago and is common in Europeans and East Asians, but rare in sub-Saharan Africans; and an allele of ASPM that appeared about 6,000 years ago and is common in Europeans, Middle Easterners and to a lesser extent East Asians, but is nearly non-existent in sub-Saharan Africans. Wade believes that the rapid spread of these alleles conferred some cognitive advantage, and one that was enough to be favoured by natural selection. Wade continues to discuss the different human trajectories in chapter six, Stasis; he writes that while the humans across the Eurasian landmass were exposed to similarly harsh glacial conditions during the Upper Paleolithic, they gradually began to diverge between east and west. It was during this period that the dog was domesticated by humans living in Siberia, who in turn crossed the Bering land bridge and populated the Americas. Wade states that an adaptation in mitochondrial DNA for cold conditions possibly facilitated this migration. Furthermore, he theorises that the "mongoloid" skull and body type of East Asians and Native Americans were physical adaptations to the cold, and also partly the result of genetic drift, whereas light skin developed separately in East Asians and "caucasoid" Europeans to better enable them to synthesise vitamin D with sunlight.

=== Social evolution, emergence of human races and division of languages ===
Wade believes that large language families, such as Indo-European shown here in its ancestral Eurasia, may have spread through agriculture.

Chapter seven, Settlement, concerns sedentism – the transition from a nomadic lifestyle to a society which remains in one place permanently – which began to rise in the Near East at the end of the Last Glacial Maximum. It required new ways of thought and social organisation; Wade thinks that an evolutionary adaptation for less aggressiveness allowed this change, noting how the skeletons of the ancestral population were less gracile than those of today. Sedentism facilitated the development of agriculture, including the cultivation and domestication of wild cereals and animals. The domestication of cattle in northern Europe and parts of Africa facilitated the spread of a genetic mutation that allowed lactose tolerance, and Wade believes this is evidence of culture and evolution interacting. The following chapter, Sociality, focuses on the common dynamics of human societies, including warfare, religion, trade, and a division of roles between the sexes. Wade theorises that these institutions have an evolutionary basis, and looks at closely related primate societies – such as those of chimpanzees and bonobos – for evidence. Wade goes on to suggest that cannibalism may have been more common in the human past by noting a common genetic adaptation that protects against Creutzfeldt–Jakob disease, which is associated with the consumption of brain.

Wade writes that along with the ongoing social evolution that occurred after humans left Africa, the human physical form also continued to evolve. This is the subject of chapter nine, Race; because humans were spread across different continents, and distance and tribal hostility limited gene flow between them, they followed different evolutionary paths. Race is not well understood, he says, because its historical implications cause it to be avoided in modern academic studies. Wade states, however, that there are reasons to reconsider the study of it; the genetic differences between races may give evidence of the different evolutionary pressures they faced, and the differences may be medically relevant. Citing Neil Risch, Wade puts forth that there are five continental races – Africans, Caucasians, Asians, Pacific Islanders and Native Americans (Note: Wade defines these continental races as follows: Africans are those whose primary ancestry is in sub-Saharan Africa, including African Americans and Afro-Caribbeans; Caucasians are the peoples of Europe, the Middle East, North Africa and the Indian subcontinent; Asians are the peoples of eastern Eurasia, such as those of China, Japan, Indochina, the Philippines and Siberia; Pacific Islanders are Aboriginal Australians and the peoples of New Guinea, Melanesia and Micronesia; and Native Americans are the indigenous peoples of the Americas.) – which are made up of smaller subdivisions called ethnicities. He explicitly avoids discussing the cause of IQ differences between races, but hypothesises that racial differences may have an influence on sporting achievement. Chapter ten, Language, concerns the spread and division of languages. Wade believes that all languages ultimately came from an ancestral language, and that many of its descendants – such as Proto-Indo-European – possibly spread through agriculture. By citing linguists such as Joseph Greenberg, Wade shows that almost all of today's languages belong to families, which in turn may belong to superfamilies such as Eurasiatic.

=== Understanding history and predicting the future ===
In chapter eleven, History, Wade demonstrates how genetics can be related to recorded history. An example given is the substantial genetic legacy of Genghis Khan and his male relatives. History correlates with this, as writers of the period stated that he had hundreds of wives. Wade then covers the origins of the British; contrary to popular belief, he writes, neither the Anglo-Saxons nor the Vikings eradicated the indigenous population, as the Y chromosomes common to Celtic speakers are carried by a large percentage of the male population of Britain. Markers in these Y chromosomes can be linked to the Basques, and he suggests that the British and Irish descend from a refuge in Spain they shared during the Last Glacial Maximum.

Wade also discusses the origin of Jews; they descend from the Middle East through their Y chromosomes, but their mitochondrial DNA resembles that of their host countries. Citing Gregory Cochran and Henry Harpending, Wade argues that Ashkenazi Jews were historically forced into intellectually demanding occupations by their European hosts, and these selective pressures favoured genes that raised their intelligence. The consequence of this, however, was an increase in sphingolipid diseases. The final chapter, Evolution, gives a summary of human evolution from its origins to the present, and declares that it is unlikely that it will ever cease. Wade speculates where evolution will lead humans in the future, suggesting further skeletal gracilisation, increases in intelligence, adaptations to the changing climate, and even the possibility of speciation.

== Background and publication ==
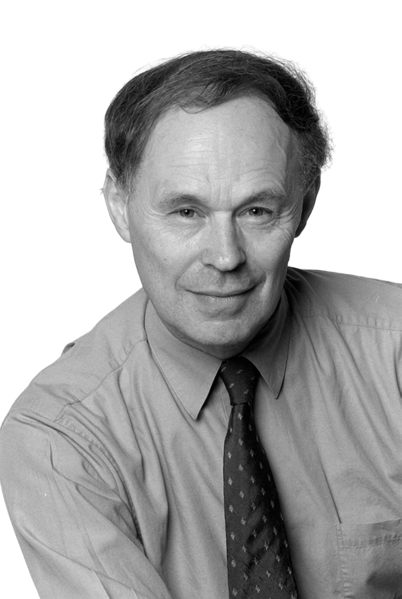
Author Nicholas Wade in 2005

Wade has written for The New York Times since 1981 as an editorial writer, science editor and a reporter, including articles supporting the idea of recent human evolution and racial differentiation. His motivation for writing Before the Dawn began during his reporting of genetics, particularly since the sequencing of the human genome in 2003, as he started to realise how it could be related to the human past. He sought to put all of the recent research of archaeology, paleoanthropology and linguistics together into one narrative revolving around genetics. Before the Dawn was published in hardcover in 2006, and then in an updated paperback in 2007, by the Penguin Group.

One of the principal themes of the book is the continual evolution of humans, especially since their migration out of Africa around 50,000 years ago. In an interview with American Scientist in 2006, Wade recognised the resistance against this idea in the fields of anthropology and archaeology, but thought that as "genetic evidence [forces a] reevaluation of the view that evolution stopped in the distant past", it would ease over time. More controversial, though, is the idea that humans populations have diverged enough to be considered "races". When asked about the "idea of race and how it is often thought of as just a social construct", he replied:

Well, I think the subject of race has been so difficult and so polluted by malign ideas that most people have just left it alone, including geneticists. … Most genetic variation is neutral – it doesn't do anything for or against the phenotype, and evolution ignores it – so most previous attempts to look at race have concluded that there's little difference between races. I think this position is the one on which the social scientists are basing their position. … If you look at the genes that do make a difference, selected genes, which are a tiny handful of the whole, you do find a number of differences, not very many, but a number of interesting differences between races as to which genes have been selected. This, of course, makes a lot of sense, because once the human family dispersed from its homeland in Africa, people faced different environments on each continent, different climates, different evolutionary challenges, and each group adapted to its environment in its own way.

American Scientist responded by suggesting that the term "race" is associated with historical baggage, and asked if perhaps a different term should be used. Wade replied, saying:

I'm not sure how that will play out. The geneticists, if you read their papers, have long been using code words. They sort of dropped the term "race" about 1980 or earlier, and instead you see code words like "population" or "population structure." Now that they're able to define race in genetic terms they tend to use other words, like "continental groups" or "continent of origin," which does, indeed, correspond to the everyday conception of race. When I'm writing I prefer to use the word race because that's the word that everyone understands. It's a word with baggage, but it's not necessarily a malign word.

In Before the Dawn, Wade suggests that genetic differences between human populations, or races, may be responsible for differences in sporting achievement. He avoids the more controversial discussion of why there are differences in IQ between them (aside from the high IQ of Ashkenazi Jews), however, saying that "[t]his dispute, whose merits lie beyond the scope of this book, has long made the study of race controversial".

== Reception ==
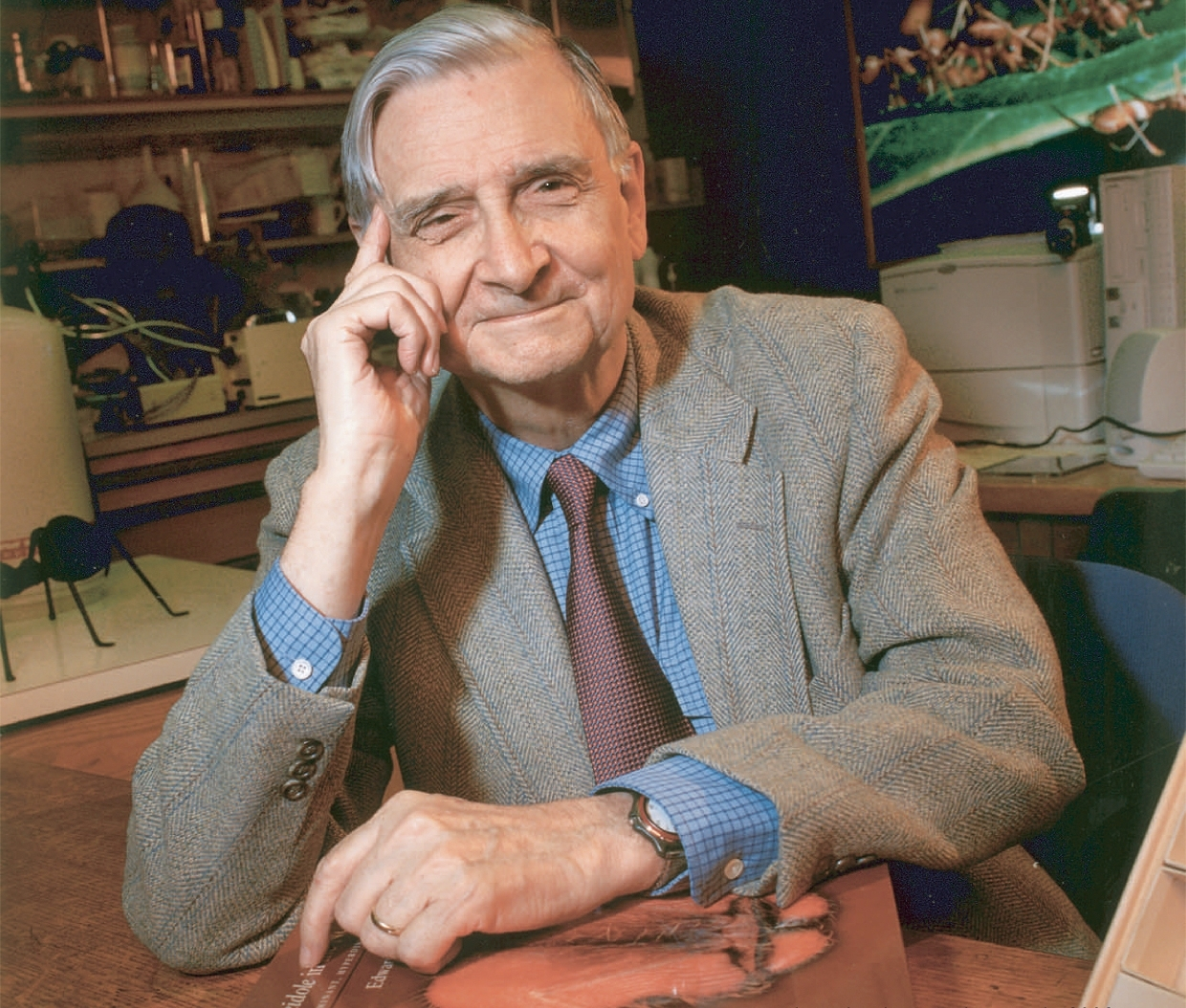
Biologist E. O. Wilson gave the book an especially positive review, which appears on the cover.

Before the Dawn received generally favourable reviews. E. O. Wilson, often known as the "father of sociobiology", proclaimed that it was "[b]y far the best book I have ever read on humanity's deep history."

James Watson, co-discoverer of the DNA double helix and Nobel Prize winner, commended the book for providing a "masterful overview on how changes in our respective DNA lineages let us begin to understand how human beings have evolved from ancestral hunter-gatherer forebears into effective members of today's advanced human societies."

Lionel Tiger, Professor of Anthropology at Rutgers University, stated that "Wade has delivered an impeccable, fearless, responsible and absorbing account" and that the book is "[b]ound to be the gold standard in the field for a very long time." Craig Stanford, Professor of Biological Sciences and Anthropology at the University of Southern California, gave the book a generally positive review in American Scientist, but offered critique by suggesting that "[i]f there is a flaw in this tightly written, insightful book, it is that Wade provides perhaps too many of the stock examples of human evolution. In my view, he spends too much time and space attempting to convince the reader that we did indeed evolve from apes (duh!) and that our own social behavior and cognition have roots in the deep human past."

On the other hand, the biological anthropologists Kenneth M. Weiss and Anne V. Buchanan, writing in the journal Nature (of which Wade was formerly deputy editor) gave the book a highly critical review, arguing that Wade commits "various well-known errors, such as equating correlation with causation and extrapolating from individual traits to group characteristics." In addition, they criticize the social and political implications Wade draws from this foundation:

But why not just enjoy the sport of fanciful speculation, even if the arguments leak like sieves? Because it's not just sport. Positions on genetic determinism often correlate with social politics, and few of us are neutral or even changeable on the issues. Wade recognizes that his ideas may not be acceptable to everyone but warns that “to falter in scientific inquiry would be a retreat into darkness”. He seems to be warning, appropriately enough, against benighted political correctness. But we should never become casual about how comparable ‘slopular’ science and very similar speculative evolutionary reasoning by leading scientists fed a venomous kind of darkness not too many decades ago. Wade's post-hoc tales often put him in step with a long march of social darwinists who, with comfortable detachment from the (currently) dominant culture, insist that we look starkly at life in the raw and not blink at what we see. But given today's limited understanding of complex traits, too often what one sees is oneself.

Peter Dizikes of The New York Times gave a mostly positive review, calling it a "timely and informative survey." However, he criticised Wade's claim that "the development of lactose tolerance shows broadly that 'genes respond to cultural changes'", and posited the alternative view that it is "a case of genes responding to an environmental change produced by society – the abundance of milk-producing cattle – and not to any abstract cultural practice." Dizikes also took issue with Wade's use of the word "race", saying that the "judgment that these regional genetic tendencies constitute 'races' has no deep scientific rationale, either. Such labels are generalizations situated atop a complicated intermingling of populations." The Washington Post columnist Richard Cohen declared that Wade "is a robust and refreshing critic of scientific political correctness."

Another positive review came from far-right political commentator John Derbyshire, who declared in the National Review that:

Before the Dawn is beautifully done, a grand genealogy of modern humanity, rooted in fact but spiced with an appropriate measure of speculation and hypothesis. Even for a reader to whom the material is already familiar – one who, for example, has been following Nicholas Wade's reports in The New York Times – it is well worth the trouble of reading this book for its narrative value, for the elegant way Wade has put it all together as a single compelling story. This is a brilliant book, by one of our best science journalists.

Other positive reviews came from Publishers Weekly; Kirkus Reviews, who called the book "meaty, well-written"; and The New York Review of Books, who said that it was "on the whole, a fascinating account of recent scientific findings."

In 2007, the book was given the Science in Society Journalism Award by the National Association of Science Writers. The judges found that Wade's writing was "skillful" in putting together the many findings about human origins in an "engaging" way.

== See also ==
- The 10,000 Year Explosion
- On Human Nature
