= SN-2 =

Chemical compound

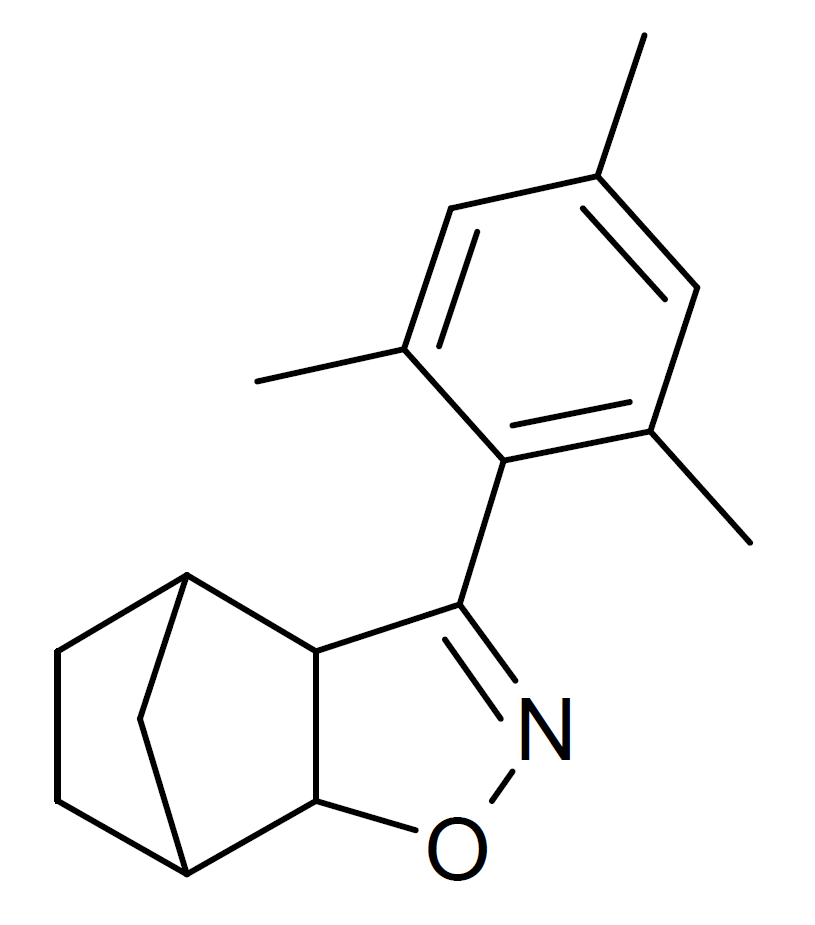

Identifiers
- IUPAC name: 5-(2,4,6-trimethylphenyl)-3-oxa-4-azatricyclo[5.2.1.0^{2,6}]dec-4-ene
- CAS Number: 823218-99-1
- PubChem CID: 11834987
- UNII: R4LCV6XQR7
- CompTox Dashboard (EPA): DTXSID501336631

Chemical and physical data
- Formula: C_{17}H_{21}NO
- Molar mass: 255.361 g·mol^{−1}
- 3D model (JSmol): Interactive image
- SMILES: CC1=CC(=C(C(=C1)C)C2=NOC3C2C4CCC3C4)C
- InChI: InChI=1S/C17H21NO/c1-9-6-10(2)14(11(3)7-9)16-15-12-4-5-13(8-12)17(15)19-18-16/h6-7,12-13,15,17H,4-5,8H2,1-3H3; Key:WKLZNTYMDOPBSE-UHFFFAOYSA-N

SN-2 is a chemical compound which acts as an "agonist" (i.e. channel opener) for the TRPML3 calcium channel, with high selectivity for TRPML3 and no significant activity at the related TRPML1 and TRPML2 channels. It has demonstrated antiviral activity in an in vitro model.

== See also ==
- MK6-83
- ML2-SA1
