= Ashkenazi Jewish intelligence =

Stereotype of Jews

Ashkenazi Jewish intelligence, Ashkenazi intelligence, or Jewish genius is a stereotype of Jews that is related to the historical race and intelligence controversy. It asserts that Ashkenazi Jews, who are a sub-group of the Jewish diaspora that coalesced in Central and Eastern Europe, tend to exhibit notably higher levels of intelligence than other ethnic groups. While some measures have indicated that Ashkenazi Jews are over-represented in creative and intellectual fields or over-perform on some cognitive tests, the contention that these measures indicate an actual intelligence advantage has been disputed and widely criticized. Controversial studies purporting to explain this phenomenon as an effect of genetic differences have been met with broad-based criticism from mainstream science.

== Background ==
Measures of intelligence often exhibit cultural bias.

In response to controversy sparked by the publication of The Bell Curve in 1994, a 1995 task force by the American Psychological Association found that racial and ethnic groups have wider range of intelligence test performance within groups than the mean difference between groups.

Over the course of subsequent decades, a consensus has emerged in the scientific community that differences in average intelligence test performance between groups cannot be ascribed to genetics. As most geneticists now believe, growing evidence indicates that environmental factors explain such differences.

== History ==
According to Noah Efron, Thorstein Veblen theorized in his 1919 work "The Intellectual Pre-eminence of Jews in Modern Europe" that Jewish success in scientific fields arose due to their "free radical" status in society—having been freed from Jewish institutions, but not yet oppressed by Christian ones—which gave them the requisite skeptical mindset to succeed in science. In 1969, Charles Percy Snow proposed a genetic explanation that was continued by Norbert Wiener and the eugenicist Nathaniel Weyl. George Steiner proposed that the "yeshiva style of thought" lay at the core of Jewish intellectual prowess, while David Hollinger writes about the "booster–bigot trap, which quickly channels discussions of Jews in comparison to other groups into the booster’s uncritical celebration of Jewish achievements or the bigot's malevolent complaint about Jewish conspiracies."

== Analysis ==
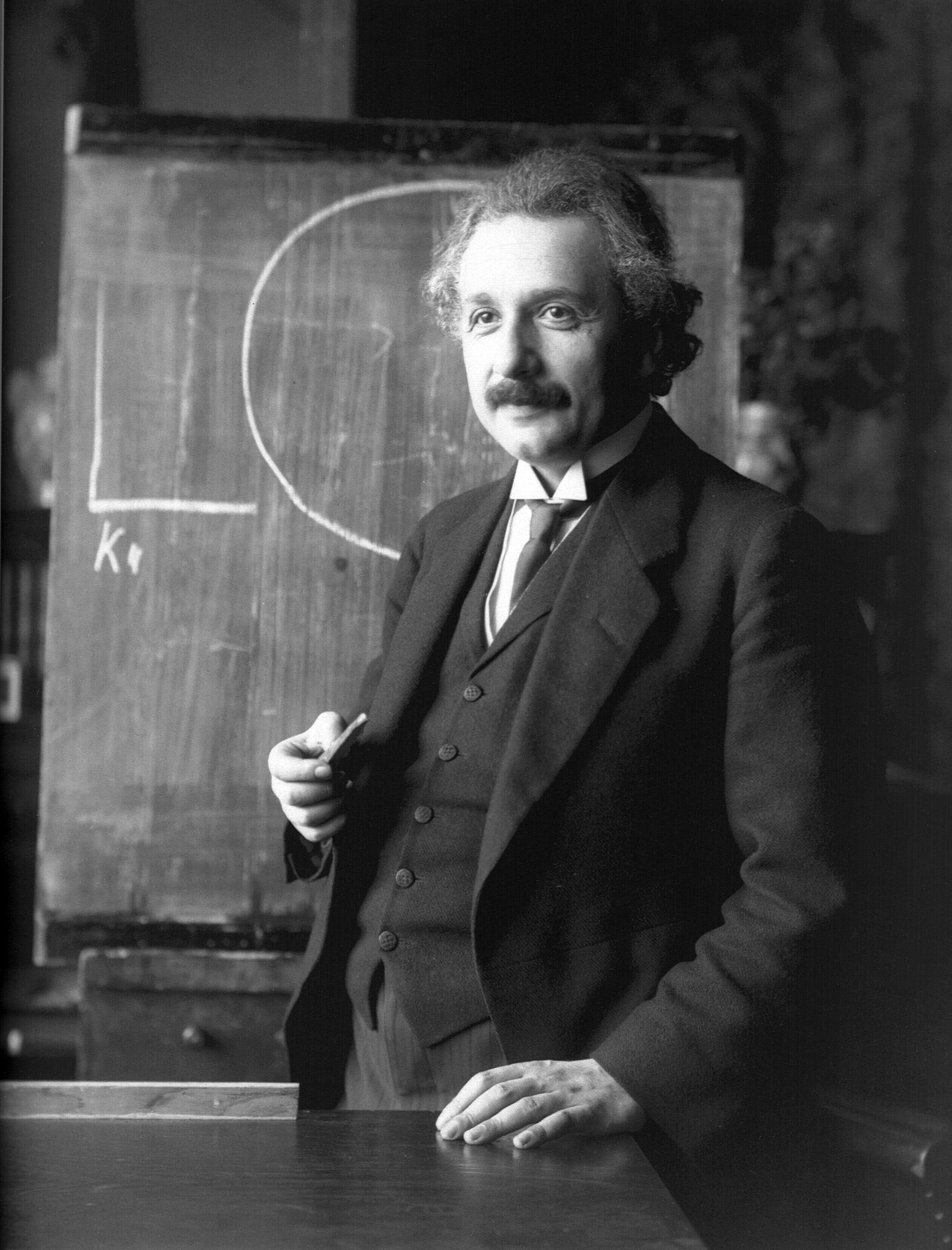
Theoretical physicist Albert Einstein (1879–1955) is often cited as one of the most prominent examples of Jewish intellectual achievement.

Examples of Jewish success in intellectual fields are often used to promote the stereotype. Jewish Nobel laureates comprise 22% of Nobel Prizes across all scientific categories, while Jewish people comprise only 0.2% of the global population, at roughly 15.8 million people. Although a small increase in average intelligence quotient (IQ) could potentially help to explain these outliers, evidence for this increase is disputable and inconclusive. Per Chad and Brym, in the 20th century, Jewish people were over-represented in Fields Medal for mathematics, Pulitzer Prize for non-fiction, Turing Award for computer science, and world chess championship winners. The 21st century has seen a decline in this perceived effect: as of 2020, since 2000, there have been no Jewish world chess champions, and the number of Jewish PhDs, middle school spelling bee and high school Science Olympiad winners in the United States has declined since the 1970s. Genetic and cultural theories of Jewish intellectual exceptionalism, Chad and Brym observe, cannot adequately account for this decline. R. Brian Ferguson, commenting on the state of research, says "it is fair to say that most, though not all, studies give Ashkenazi descendants a higher IQ than non-Jewish whites", but argues that the effect size remains contentious and unknown. In a review of intelligence research, Nisbett and colleagues state there is "little good evidence" as to the IQ levels of Ashkenazi Jews. Recent publications by amateur race scientists have attempted to demonstrate a genetic basis for Ashkenazi achievement based on polygenic scores derived from genome-wide association studies, but the methodologies and conclusions of these studies have been shown to be fallacious.

=== Intellectual achievement ===
Because intelligence scores and metrics of achievement are associated, higher average IQ scores for Ashkenazi Jews have been proposed as an explanation for Jewish overrepresentation in various intellectual fields. However, Jewish overachievement is greater than what can be explained simply by IQ.

=== Selected studies ===
==== Lynn paper ====
A 2004 paper by the self-described "scientific racist" Richard Lynn reported that American Jews obtained significantly higher vocabulary scores (accompanied by a conversion into conventional IQs) than the average White American, and especially higher scores compared to Black Americans. A group of researchers called for the retraction of Richard Lynn's publications that use IQ tests to argue that some races are inferior, citing Leon Kamin's opinion that "Lynn's distortions and misrepresentations of the data constitute a truly venomous racism, combined with the scandalous disregard for scientific objectivity".

==== Natural History of Ashkenazi Intelligence ====
In 2006, a controversial paper titled "Natural History of Ashkenazi Intelligence", published in the Journal of Biosocial Science, proposed a biological basis for Ashkenazi Jewish intelligence. The paper was authored by Gregory Cochran, Jason Hardy and Henry Harpending, who have been linked to theories described as "scientific racism" by the Southern Poverty Law Center and described as having a "long history of promoting race science" by journalist Gavin Evans. The authors hypothesize that Ashkenazi Jews as a group inherit higher verbal and mathematical intelligence on the basis of inherited diseases, selective pressure from the unique economic situation of Ashkenazi Jews in the Middle Ages, and relative lack of intermarriage with outside groups. They specifically suggest that this selective pressure for increased intelligence explains the high prevalence of sphingolipid disorders like Tay-Sachs, Niemann-Pick and Gaucher's disease among Ashkenazi Jews. This paper suggested that the average IQ score of Ashkenazi Jews falls in a range of 108–115 under some studies, which would be significantly higher than that of any other ethnic group in the world.

The paper attracted significant criticism and controversy. Initial media coverage of the paper was mixed, with some media outlets such as the Economist and the New York Times publishing articles about the study, described by Jennifer Senior as legitimizing the theory. Geneticist David Reich has argued that, contrary to selective pressure theory, some of the inherited diseases that Ashkenazi Jews suffer may be more likely due to genetic drift. Geneticist Adam Rutherford argues that some of these diseases may have been commonplace during the Middle Ages, and that genetic studies may indicate the genetic bottleneck that caused the accumulation of disease occurred before the medieval period. In a population genetics study of Ashkenazi Jews, Bray et al. contrast Cochran et al.'s speculation about selection for disease loci to their findings that selection most likely does not explain the presence of lysosomal storage diseases. While Cochran's hypothesis claims selection pressure, geneticist David B. Goldstein supports the alternative explanation of founder effects and genetic drift for the high frequency of these diseases.

Goldstein critiques Cochran et al.'s "speculative" and "circumstantial" hypothesis that lysosomal diseases that occur at higher rates among Ashkenazi Jews, like Tay-Sachs, mucolipidosis type IV, Niemann-Pick, and Gaucher's, confer an intelligence advantage to heterozygous carriers obtained due to medieval selection pressures. Although Goldstein acknowledges that the possibility that glycosphingolipids relate somehow to intelligence cannot be ruled out, he points out the weaknesses and dangers of the hypothesis, particularly the lack of robust empirical evidence that the specific disease-associated alleles actually relate to cognitive function.

Rutherford notes that none of the disease genes that Cochran et al.'s highlight in their paper as driving selection for intelligence are associated with brains or cognitive abilities in any genetic databases.

When discussing Cochran et al.'s genetic hypothesis, Goldstein notes that Jews do tend to over-perform on certain cognitive tests and in certain disciplines, but opines that familial, cultural, and environmental differences can explain this, noting that "Jews have a tradition of scholarship that is as old as the Torah". He states that the hypothesis is at least testable, and proposes an experiment: administration of standardized cognitive tests to a sufficiently large sample of those who do and do not carry the relevant mutations.

Researchers have proposed alternative explanations to explain elevated IQ scores among Ashkenazi Jews. Jordan Chad and Robert Byrm argue that there is "little credible evidence" to "support the notion that genetic differences between ethnic groups can give rise to appreciable differences in intelligence." They propose an alternative sociological theory where Jewish intellectual attainment is not determined by genetics or even cultural factors, but by proximate social circumstances.

Sander Gilman has argued that attempts to portray Jews with tropes of being physically enfeebled geniuses "carry with them much of the baggage of racism". Brian Wilson argues that Cochran’s claims about Ashkenazi intelligence reflect a continuation of earlier race science frameworks, as noted by scholars such as Gilman and Evans.

===== Bret Stephens article =====
Bret Stephens cited the study in a New York Times op-ed, suggesting that Jewish genius is innate to culture instead of biology, which later led to an editor's note apologizing for referencing the study at all. Adam Shapiro has argued that while praising Jewish genius may seem to combat antisemitism, Stephens was actually attempting to co-opt the ideas of white supremacy by using race science. Shapiro and other commentators also argue that using intelligence tests to divide and describe specific ethnic groups, even when to prove the superiority of one group, is still linked to eugenics.

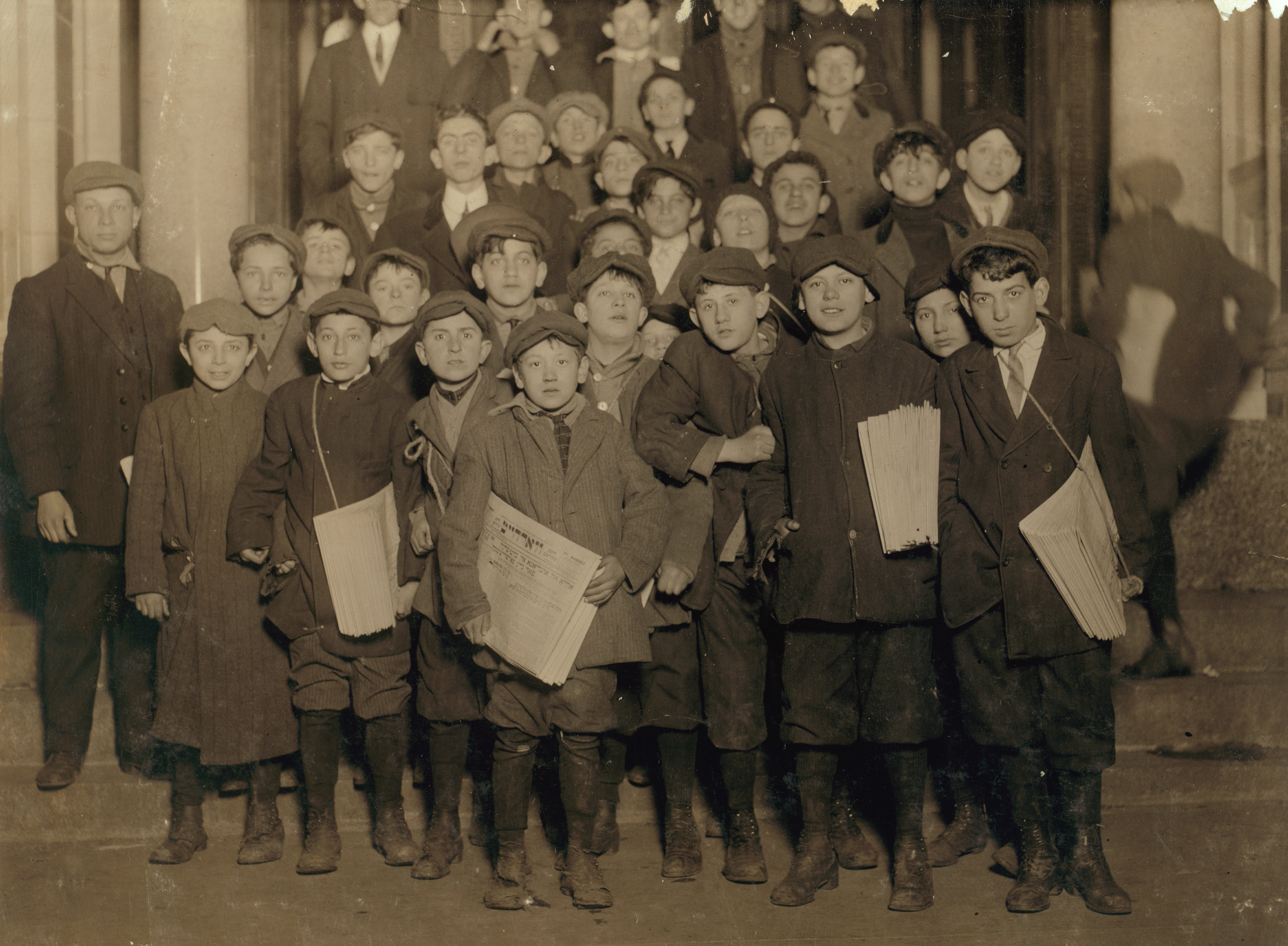
Paperboys waiting for the Jewish Daily Forward in 1913 New York City

=== Alternative explanations ===
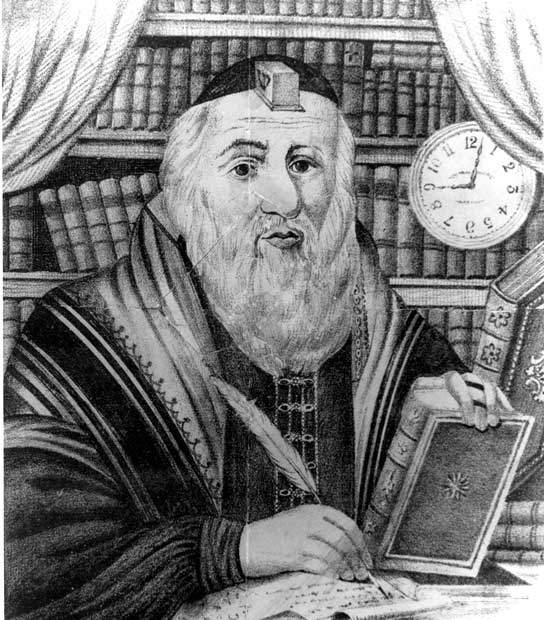
Rabbi Elijah ben Solomon Zalman (1720-1797), called the Vilna Gaon or the genius from Vilnius, advocated for the value of secular studies.

Bret Stephens has opined in The New York Times that the intellectual rigor of religious studies, especially in the context of constant upheaval, has allowed intellectual flexibility. Malcolm Gladwell similarly argues in Outliers that the rigorous Talmud schools may foster intellectualism and perseverance in Jewish students. Cochran et al. say that Sephardic and Mizrahi Jews "do not have high average IQ test scores" compared to Ashkenazi, arguing that any theory of Ashkenazi intelligence must explain why this is. However, Jerry Hirsch points to a study of Middle Eastern Jews that finds that when raised in kibbutzim, they have IQ scores identical to those of European origin. Howard Metzenberg suggests that rather than natural selection, a "cultural emphasis on learning and study" explain Jewish intellectual achievement.

Chad and Brym analyze the representation of Ashkenazi Jews in University of Toronto Medical School, and observe that despite the lifting of discriminatory quotas in 1959, the representation of Ashkenazi Jews actually decreased over time. They outline sociological circumstances linked to intellectual attainment that could explain the changes over time. They posit that cultural or genetic explanations do not account for variation over relatively short time periods, and propose that first generations' access to opportunities and resources, and ability to compete for them, may better explain the variation.

=== Criticism ===
Some have argued that the elevation of Jewish intelligence based on both biology or sociology may feed into model minority myths that harm both Jewish and black people. Yglesias has written that the idea is used to legitimise scientific racism, including the idea that Black people in particular are genetically inferior.

Gilman has argued that viewing intelligence through a racial, genetic, or ethnic lens is particularly problematic for Jews as it may feed into multiple antisemitic tropes and generalizations being applied across large and diverse groups. Gilman also argued that pointing out identity when attributing success contributes to tribalism, and ignores social situations that allow such success to occur. He believes that implicit assumptions of Jewish intelligence may help fuel fear and common stereotypes of Jews controlling higher professions such as law.

== See also ==
- Genetic studies of Jews
  - Medical genetics of Jews
- History of the race and intelligence controversy
  - Race and intelligence
  - Scientific racism
- History of antisemitism
- Racism in Jewish communities
  - Ashkenormativity
- Philosemitism
