= Schally =

Schally is a surname. Notable people with the surname include:

- Andrew Schally (1926–2024), American endocrinologist
- Kazimierz Schally (1895–1967), Polish general
