= C22H22N2O3 =

The molecular formula C_{22}H_{22}N_{2}O_{3} (molar mass: 362.429 g/mol) may refer to:

- ML-SA1
- GLPG1205
