= Jennifer Raff =

American geneticist (born 1979)

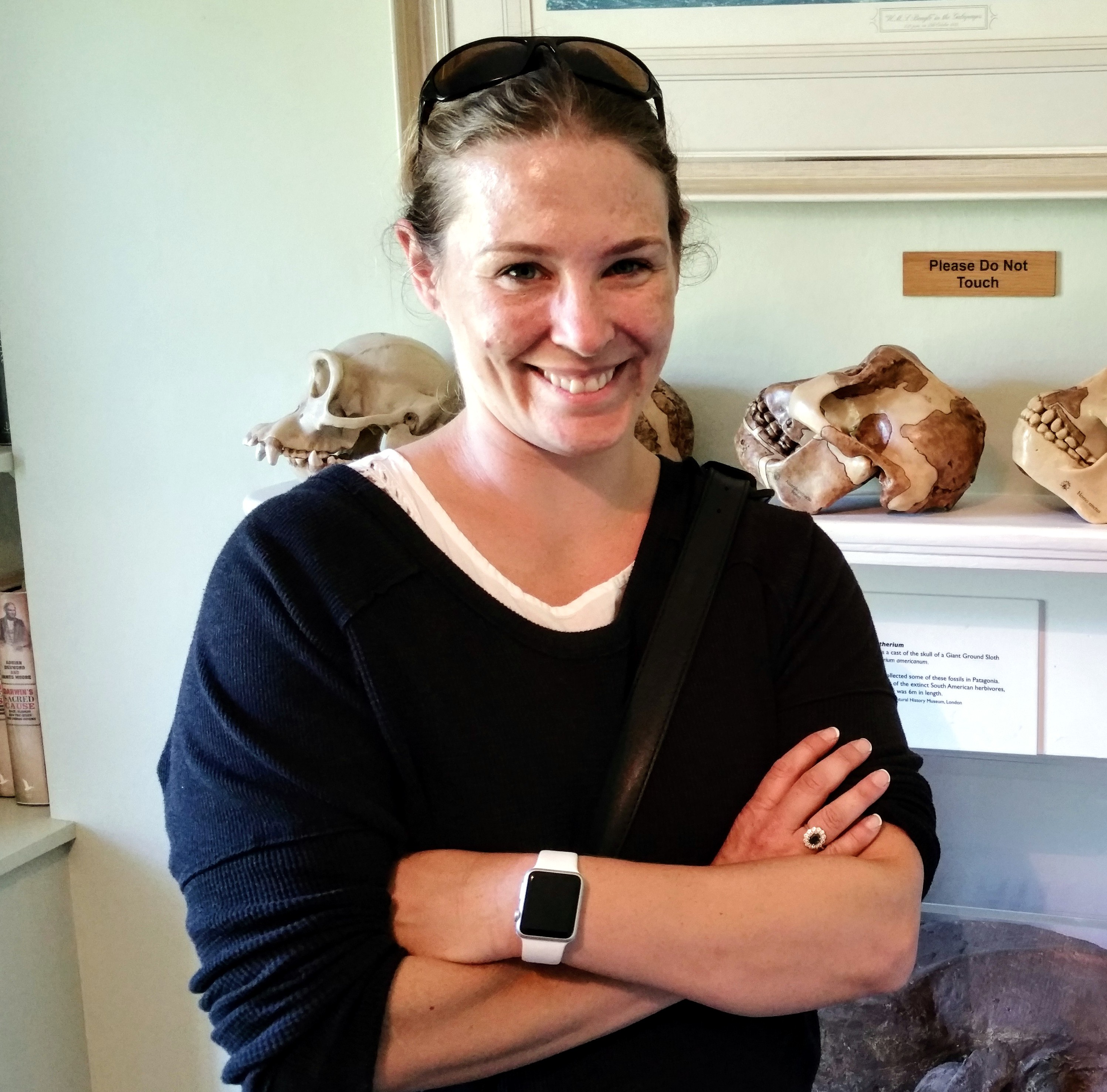
- Jennifer Raff at Down House, 2015
- Born: August 29, 1979 (age 46); Carbondale, Illinois, U.S.
- Education: Indiana University (BA)
- Known for: Ancient DNA in the Americas; Scientific literacy education
- Scientific career
- Fields: Genetics; Ancient DNA; Biological Anthropology; American Prehistory
- Institutions: University of Kansas; University of Texas
- Thesis: An ancient DNA perspective on the prehistory of the Lower Illinois Valley (2008)
- Doctoral advisor: Frederika Kaestle
- Other academic advisors: Dennis O'Rourke; M. Geoffrey Hayes; Deborah Bolnick
- Website: www.violentmetaphors.com

Jennifer Anne Raff (born 1979, née Kedzie) is an American geneticist and an associate professor of anthropology at the University of Kansas. She specializes in anthropological genetics relating to the initial peopling of the Americas and subsequent prehistory of Indigenous populations throughout North America. She is the President of the American Association of Anthropological Genetics. Alongside her research, Raff is a science communicator who writes and gives public talks about topics in science literacy.

== Early life and education ==
Raff was born in Carbondale, Illinois. She moved from Missouri to Indiana when she started high school. While she was a child, her mother started a doctoral degree in neuroscience, which inspired Raff to follow a career in scientific research. During her last year of high school, Raff asked a professor in a nearby university if she could join his laboratory and started to work on molecular biology. She received a B.A. in biology and anthropology from Indiana University Bloomington in 2001, after which she worked for a year in a yeast molecular genetics lab. She received a master's degree in anthropology in 2008, and a doctoral degree in genetics and biological anthropology in 2008, also from Indiana University.

== Research and career ==
As a postdoctoral scholar, Raff worked with Dennis O’Rourke at the University of Utah, with M. Geoffrey Hayes at Northwestern University Feinberg School of Medicine in Chicago Illinois, and with Deborah Bolnick at the University of Texas at Austin.

In 2015, Raff was appointed assistant professor of Biological Anthropology at the University of Kansas where she conducts population genetics research on ancient and contemporary North American populations from the North American Arctic, the Midwest, and Texas. Her research involves the analysis of genomes in ancient and contemporary DNA, which she uses to understand the histories of human populations. In particular, Raff has focused on the development of new approaches to extract ancient DNA.

In 2019, Raff was awarded a $450,000, three-year National Science Foundation Search Grant to investigate the genetic history of the Aleut people. The project will see Raff investigating genomic information from ancient people for the Aleutian Islands. As of that same year, Raff was recognized as a Docking Faculty Scholar.

Raff teaches courses on Fundamentals of Physical Anthropology, on Human Evolution, and on Critical Analysis of Scientific Literature. She is a faculty member with the Summer Internship for Indigenous Peoples in Genomics, a program designed to increase representation of Indigenous peoples in the field of genetics. In 2018, Raff was made Vice President of the American Association of Anthropological Genetics and promoted to president in 2019.

Her first book, Origin: A Genetic History of the Americas, was published in February 2022. The book is a genetic history of humans in North and South America and looks to teach people about the fundamental science of genetics. Raff is represented by agents Janklow & Nesbit and publishers Twelve Books.

=== Public engagement ===
Raff has written for public audiences on her blog "Violent Metaphors", in the Huffington Post, for Forbes and for The Guardian. She has written about the importance of vaccination – in particular, her article "Dear parents, you are being lied to" has been translated into several languages, including German, Italian, Norwegian, Vietnamese, Croatian. She has spoken about the dangers of scientific racism and, in particular, Nicholas Wade's book A Troublesome Inheritance. Raff was included in Angela Saini's Superior: The Return of Race Science.

Raff provided testimony to the Texas Board of Education concerning the teaching of evolution in schools. She also provided a commentary about the information that could be learned from Elizabeth Warren's DNA test.

Raff has worked to improve public understanding of the scientific process. She has appeared on several podcasts, including Science for the People, NPR Science Friday, Inside Science and on the BBC World Service. She was part of The Nature of Things with David Suzuki episode on the Ice bridge. She frequently gives public talks on science literacy issues, and was an invited speaker at Skepticon.

== Selected publications ==
- Raff, Jennifer (2022). Origin: A Genetic History of the Americas. Twelve (Grand Central Publishing). ISBN 9781538749715.
- Raff, Jennifer (2016). Handbook on Science Literacy. Kendall Hunt. ISBN 9781524907358.
- Raff, Jennifer; O'Rourke, Dennis H. (2010-02-23). "The Human Genetic History of the Americas: The Final Frontier". Current Biology. 20 (4): 202–207. Bibcode:2010CBio...20.R202O. doi:10.1016/j.cub.2009.11.051. PMID 20178768. S2CID 14479088.
- Raff, Jennifer; O'Rourke, Dennis H. (2010-02-23). "Ancient DNA perspectives on American colonization and population history". American Journal of Physical Anthropology. 146 (4): 503–514. doi:10.1002/ajpa.21594. PMID 21913177.

== Personal life ==
Raff has trained in various martial arts alongside her sister, retired mixed martial artist Julie Kedzie. She holds a third dan black belt in Tae Kwon Do. She has also trained in MMA. She reached the semifinals in the Chicago Golden Gloves Women's 156 pound Senior Novice division in 2012, but lost the title bout to Allie Ayers.

Raff is married to Kenneth Colin McRoberts, and lives in Lawrence, Kansas. They have one son.
