= The 10,000 Year Explosion =

Book by Gregory Cochran and Henry Harpending

The 10,000 Year Explosion: How Civilization Accelerated Human Evolution
- Authors: Gregory Cochran; Henry Harpending
- Language: English
- Subject: Recent human evolution
- Genre: Non-fiction
- Publisher: Basic Books
- Publication date: 2009
- Media type: Print
- Pages: 304
- ISBN: 0-465-00221-8
- Dewey Decimal: 599.93'8-dc22
- LC Class: GN281.4.c632 2009

The 10,000 Year Explosion: How Civilization Accelerated Human Evolution is a 2009 book by anthropologists Gregory Cochran and Henry Harpending. Starting with their own take on the conventional wisdom that the evolutionary process stopped when modern humans appeared, the authors explain the genetic basis of their view that human evolution is accelerating, illustrating it with some examples.

Some reviewers considered that the book raised valuable questions but relied on discredited views. Others criticized it for oversimplifying history and reifying the concept of race.

== Opinions in the book ==
Cochran and Harpending put forward the idea that the development of agriculture has caused an enormous increase in the rate of human evolution, including numerous evolutionary adaptations to the different challenges and lifestyles that resulted. Moreover, they argue that these adaptations have varied across different human populations, depending on factors such as when the various groups adopted agriculture, and the extent to which such groups mixed genetically with other population groups.

Such changes, they argue, include not just well-known physical and biological adaptations such as skin colour, disease resistance, and lactose tolerance, but also personality and cognitive adaptations that are starting to emerge from genetic research. These may include tendencies towards (for example) reduced physical strength, enhanced long-term planning, or increased docility, all possibly counter-productive in hunter-gatherer societies, but favoured adaptations in a world of agriculture and its resulting trade, governments and urbanization. These adaptations are even more important in the modern world, and have helped shape today's nation states. The authors speculate that the scientific and Industrial Revolutions came about in part due to genetic changes in Europe over the past millennium, the absence of which had limited the progress of science in Ancient Greece. The authors suggest we would expect to see fewer adaptive changes among the Amerindians and sub-Saharan Africans, who have farmed for the shortest times and were genetically isolated from older civilizations by geographical barriers. In groups that had remained foragers, such as Aboriginal Australians, there would presumably be no such adaptations at all. This may explain why Indigenous Australians and many Native Americans experience characteristic health problems when exposed to modern Western diets. Similarly, Amerindians, Australian Aboriginals, and Polynesians, for example, had experienced very little infectious disease. They had not evolved immunities as did many Old World dwellers, and were decimated upon contact with the wider world.

== Summary ==
The book's main thesis is that human civilisation greatly accelerated increases in the rates of evolution. The authors begin their discussion by providing two quotes they feel portray the conventional wisdom on this topic. First, they quote Ernst Mayr as stating in 1963: "Something must have happened to weaken the selective pressure drastically. We cannot escape the conclusion that man's evolution towards manness suddenly came to a halt." Second, they quote Stephen J. Gould as stating in 2000: "There's been no biological change in humans in 40,000 or 50,000 years. Everything we call culture and civilization we've built with the same body and brain."

This had become the established viewpoint—when modern humans appeared, evolution was essentially over. The received wisdom is based on the doctrine that human minds are the same, everywhere: Bastian's Psychic Unity of Mankind. Unfortunately, the authors find, this is no more than wishful thinking. Were it true, human bodies would also be the same worldwide, which clearly they are not. Finns cannot be mistaken for Zulus, nor Zulus for Finns. Not only are there strong reasons to believe that significant human evolution is theoretically possible, or even likely; it is completely obvious that it has taken place, since people are different from one another.

The first four of the book's seven chapters serve as a preamble to the final three. First, Cochran and Harpending present evidence for recent, accelerated human evolution after the invention of agriculture. In itself, this argument represents a paradigm shift. The International HapMap Project and other studies have shown that selection is ongoing and has accelerated over time. This has been a key discovery in human biology, and Cochran and Harpending, building on their own work and that of others such as John Hawks of the University of Wisconsin-Madison, tie the advent of agriculture—and the selection pressures resulting from the new diets, new modes of habitation, new animal neighbors, and new modes of living that agriculture made possible—to this accelerating evolution.

=== Neanderthals ===
Wolpoff writes that Cochran and Harpending continue to refute conventional wisdom in their discussion of the Neanderthals. For natural selection to have a chance, they argue, there need to be favourable mutations, or favourable combinations of existing alleles such as genes for blue eyes or pale skin. Cochran and Harpending concentrate on the Neolithic farming revolution as the beginning of major population expansions that provided enough mutations to accelerate genetic change. Infectious diseases were another consequence of the early urban populations and soon became a new source of selection pressures. The origins of many recently adapted genes have now been traced to this period, creating effects such as regional differences in skin colour and skeletal gracility. Adaptations may have sacrificed muscle strength for higher intelligence and less aggressive human behaviours. By 5000 years ago, the authors estimate that adaptive alleles were coming into existence at a rate about 100 times faster than during the Pleistocene. This is the ‘‘explosion’’ of the book’s title.

Research cited by Cochran and Harpending provides evidence of genetic mixing between modern humans and an ancient Homo lineage such as the Neanderthals. According to Cochran and Harpending, it supports the idea that modern humans could have benefited by acquiring adaptive alleles evolved by our Neanderthal relatives - in this case, microcephalin, an adaptive allele associated with brain development. Microcephalin (MCPH1) regulates brain size, and has evolved under strong positive selection in the human evolutionary lineage. One genetic variant of Microcephalin, which arose about 37,000 years ago, increased its frequency in modern humans too rapidly, they argue, to be compatible with neutral genetic drift. As anatomically modern humans emerged from Africa and spread across the globe, the "indigenous" Homo populations they encountered had already inhabited their respective regions for long periods of time and might have been better adapted to the local environments than the colonizers. It follows, it is argued, that modern humans, although probably superior in their own way, could have benefited from adaptive alleles gained by interbreeding with the populations they replaced, as was proposed to be the case for the brain-size-determining gene microcephalin. However, analysis of the genomes of neanderthals did not find the microcephalin gene variant in question to be present, and later studies have not found the gene variant to be associated with mental ability.

=== Agriculture ===
Farming, which, the authors say, produces 10 to 100 times more calories per acre than foraging, carried this trend further. Over the period from 10,000 BC to AD 1, the world population increased about a hundredfold - estimates range from 40 to 170 times. An accelerated rate of evolution is a direct result of the larger human population. More people will have more mutations, thereby increasing opportunity for evolutionary change under natural selection. The spread of rapidly expanding populations eventually outpaced the spread of favourable mutations under selection in those populations, so for the first time in human history favourable mutations could not fully disperse throughout the human species. In addition, of course, selection pressures changed once farming was adopted, favouring distinctive adaptations in different geographic areas.

=== Gene flow ===
About halfway through the book, Cochran and Harpending pause to consider two different ways of looking at the information found in gene variants. Researchers commonly see them merely as markers of human migration, ignoring their functions. The authors support such research, but argue for a more complete understanding of the geographic distributions of genes. Where the usual geographical analysis treats the distribution of genes as an effect of history, in the authors' view, the genes themselves are a major cause: Two variants in the same gene do not necessarily have the same effect, and their relative, selective benefits will control the spread of genes through populations in both space and time.

=== Expansions ===
From that platform the authors discuss ideas that range from the possible origins of the Arthurian legend in Britain to the Spanish colonization of the Americas. Others have attempted this, for example in Jared Diamond's Guns, Germs, and Steel. But, according to Kelleher, Cochran and Harpending go one better than Diamond. He goes on to state that where Diamond was content with environmental determinism, at times opposing the roles of human biology and population differences, Cochran and Harpending embrace them both. Their discussion of gene flow becomes the core of an argument for biology as central to history, and the backdrop for the book's two major hypotheses.

The first seeks to resolve a longstanding debate in historical linguistics by making a case for the Kurgan hypothesis on the origins of the Indo-European language group. The Kurgan theory holds that Indo-European speakers came from lands between the Black and Caspian seas before spreading their language by conquest. The authors suggest that dairy farming and a complementary adaptation–the ability to digest lactose in adulthood–lie behind their conquests. With a walking food source, the milk-drinking warriors defeated their plant-growing neighbours. Drinking milk, from cows, horses, or camels, is a behavior shared by many of history's greatest conquering peoples, whether Kurgans, Scythians, Arabs, or Mongols. Without continuing evolution, the ability to digest milk could never have arisen. In fact, it has done so several times, in different ways, in various places, and it has helped shape human history. Kelleher comments that the authors’ argument makes it difficult to imagine the language in which their book would have been written, were it not for the ability to digest milk.

=== Ashkenazi Jews ===
The second major argument, which takes up the final chapter, sets out to explain why Ashkenazi Jews have a mean IQ so much higher than that of the population in general, as well as a higher rate of some genetic disorders such as Tay-Sachs disease. This argument had been published previously in an earlier paper. This hypothesis proposes that from A.D. 800 until around 1700, Askhenazi Jews were restricted to professions that required high intelligence, and that this produced a selective pressure in favor of intelligence. When faced with a sudden threat, evolution may favor any change that offers protection, and Cochran and Harpending propose that selection for genes promoting high intelligence thus had the side effect of also selecting for these genetic disorders. The hypothesis has drawn a mixed reaction from scientists, with some arguing the hypothesis is highly implausible, and others regarding it as worth considering. According to cognitive psychologist Steven Pinker, this theory "meets the standards of a good scientific theory, though it is tentative and could turn out to be mistaken." According to the Southern Poverty Law Center, these claims were based on the work of discredited psychologist and antisemitic conspiracy theorist Kevin MacDonald.

== Reception ==
The paleoanthropologist Milford H. Wolpoff praised the book's central thesis as being insightful and worthy of further research, while also criticizing the book for its reification of biological race, and its dubious or oversimplified view of history.

In New Scientist, Christopher Willis wrote that the "evidence the authors present an overwhelming case that natural selection has recently acted strongly on us". However, Willis criticizes the authors for not discussing what the "recent and continuing evolution means for our species as a whole". Willis concludes by saying that "the book offers a limited and biased interpretation of some very exciting research".

In Evolutionary Psychology, Gregory Gorelik and Todd K. Shackelford wrote, "Although many of their arguments need more fleshing out and some may not withstand the assault of further scientific analysis, the authors are stunningly creative when considering human history. If even a handful of their arguments survive the onslaught of rigorous scientific scrutiny, Cochran and Harpending will have offered a valuable and novel approach to addressing questions of recent human evolution."

In Evolution and Human Behavior, Edward Hagen wrote that the book makes "many unsupported and often questionable assertions", but it is nevertheless valuable in raising "bold questions about major historical encounters between populations — Neanderthal and modern humans, German tribes and Romans, Europeans and Native Americans — in light of formidable (but not unassailable) arguments from population genetics". Hagen considered that it "should also be on the summer reading list of all evolutionary social scientists".

Anthropologist Cadell Last wrote that by using race as a natural fact, the book "undermines the attempt to find a legitimate scientific approach to understanding recent human evolution and conceptualizing human genetic diversity" and that it was "unfortunate" that it had received "praise from prominent, influential well-established biological anthropologists" such as John D. Hawks.

Evolutionary anthropologist Keith Hunley, writing for the Journal of Anthropological Research, described the book's thesis as interesting, but said the list of behavioral adaptations supposedly favored by agricultural lifeways was "bizarre". Per Hunley, the authors "provide no evidence whatsoever that there is any genetic basis to the specific behaviors in their list." Hunley specifically criticizes the last chapter on Ashkenazim for being based on shoddy or fabricated data, and for failing to mention the human suffering caused by pseudoscientific racism. Hunley says the book "fails utterly" to meet the stringent scientific standards of behavioral genetic research.

Rosalind Arden, a psychiatrist and research fellow at the CPNSS, reviewing the book in Twin Research and Human Genetics wrote that it's well-referenced and "replete with facts and ideas"; she also stated that "the authors have fleshed out their hypotheses and set out their evidential stalls very neatly".

According to a review by editor Alan Cane in the Financial Times, "Interestingly, the authors make no predictions for our future. And accordingly, biologists – as opposed to social scientists – may not find their thesis all that novel. But it is an engaging book with valuable information about how advantageous genes spread through a population".

In Seed, T.J. Kelleher wrote that "The strength and sheer number of the book’s best sections, however, more than overshadow the wanness and paucity of its worst. Even with its flaws, Cochran and Harpending’s book has provided the best example to date of what E.O. Wilson would recognize as consilient history".

== See also ==
- Before the Dawn: Recovering the Lost History of Our Ancestors
