= Henry Harpending =

American anthropologist (1944–2016)

- Born: Henry Cosad Harpending; January 13, 1944; Dundee, New York, U.S.
- Died: April 3, 2016 (aged 72)
- Education: Hamilton College (BA); Harvard University (MA, PhD)
- Known for: The 10,000 Year Explosion
- Scientific career
- Fields: Anthropology; Population genetics
- Workplaces: University of Utah; Pennsylvania State University; University of New Mexico
- Thesis: Kung Hunter-Gatherer Population Structure (1971)
- Doctoral advisor: William W. Howells

Henry Cosad Harpending (January 13, 1944 – April 3, 2016) was an American anthropologist and distinguished professor at the University of Utah, best known for his 2009 book The 10,000 Year Explosion, co-authored with Gregory Cochran. Educated at Hamilton College and Harvard University, his career included faculty positions at Penn State and the University of New Mexico. He was a member of the National Academy of Sciences.

Harpending worked primarily in biological anthropology and population genetics, but also conducted ethnographic fieldwork with the !Kung and Herero peoples of Southern Africa. His work in population genetics pioneered the study of the relationship between genetics and geography.

Harpending was married twice and had three children. He died in 2016.

== Education and career ==
Harpending was born in Dundee, New York, in 1944. He graduated from Dundee Central High School in 1961, received his A.B. degree from Hamilton College in 1964, and earned his Ph.D. from Harvard University in 1972. After graduating from Harvard, he worked at Yale (1972–1973), the University of New Mexico (1973–85), Penn State (1985–1997), and the University of Utah (1997–2016).

Over the course of his academic career, Harpending contributed to over 120 publications. He was elected a member of the National Academy of Sciences in 1996.

== Work ==
=== Population genetics ===
According to a biography by Alan R. Rogers, in the 1970s Harpending pioneered the study of the relationship between genetics and geography, developing methods that are still in use. He also overturned the prevailing understanding of group selection, by showing that group selection is most likely to operate when there is strong gene flow between groups, rather than when they are isolated from one another. Harpending also developed the approach of analyzing populations using R-matrix methods, and together with Trefor Jonkin, wrote the most highly cited chapter in the 1973 handbook Methods and Theory of Anthropological Genetics.

=== !Kung and Herero ===
Harpending did fieldwork in Southern Africa (Botswana, Namibia) and spoke the !Kung language. In 1981, while with the University of New Mexico, Harpending studied the group during the South African Border War. Harpending described the !Kung society as "like Rorschachs" because anthropologists could draw contradictory conclusions. His fieldwork was the basis of the 1993 monograph The Structure of an African Pastoralist Community, with Pennington.

Harpending also did extensive fieldwork on the Herero people, a cattle-herding group in the Botswana area. Herero are locally known for "their traditionalism, their wealth in cattle and their dominating older women". Harpending's previous experience with the !Kung people was useful because many Herero are bilingual in !Kung. Harpending had previous contact with Herero from earlier research trips.

In 1973, Harpending helped start the Kalahari People's Fund. The KPF was an outgrowth of the multidisciplinary Harvard Kalahari Research Group led by Richard Lee and Irven DeVore. Newsweek described the KPF as one of the first people's advocacy organizations in the US with professional anthropological expertise behind it.

=== Ashkenazi intelligence ===
In the 2005 paper "Natural History Of Ashkenazi Intelligence", Gregory Cochran, Jason Hardy, and Harpending suggest that the high average IQ of Ashkenazi Jews may be attributed to natural selection for intelligence during the Middle Ages and a low rate of genetic inflow. They hypothesize that the occupational profile of the Jewish community in medieval Europe had resulted in selection pressure for mutations that increase intelligence, but can also result in hereditary neurological disorders.

Harpending's hypothesis about Ashkenazi Jewish intelligence has attracted both praise and criticism, with some scientists regarding the theory as highly implausible, while others regard it as worth considering. According to cognitive psychologist Steven Pinker, this theory "meets the standards of a good scientific theory, though it is tentative and could turn out to be mistaken." On the other hand, geneticist David Reich has argued that the hypothesis is contradicted by evidence that the higher rate of genetic diseases among Ashkenazi Jews is in fact due to genetic drift.

=== The 10,000 Year Explosion ===
In The 10,000 Year Explosion: How Civilization Accelerated Human Evolution (2009), which he co-authored with Gregory Cochran, Harpending suggests that a common belief that human genetic adaptation stopped 40,000 years ago is incorrect and that humans evolved increasingly rapidly in response to the new challenges presented by agriculture and civilization. The result, the authors suggest, was accelerating evolution which has varied according to new niches or environments that particular populations inhabit.

The final chapter of The 10,000 Year Explosion expands on Cochran, Hardy and Hapending's paper in the Journal of Biosocial Science on the issue of Ashkenazi Jewish intelligence. Harpending and Cochran argue that the cause of the claim of Ashkenazim having higher mean verbal and mathematical intelligence than other ethnic groups (as well as having a relatively high number of genetic diseases, such as Tay–Sachs disease, Canavan disease, Niemann–Pick disease, Gaucher's disease, familial dysautonomia, Bloom syndrome, Fanconi anemia, cystic fibrosis and mucolipidosis IV) relates to the historically isolated population of Jews in Europe.

== Views on race ==
The Southern Poverty Law Center has documented Harpending's works and statements on race, noting his association with white supremacist groups and referring to his work as an attempt to perpetuate scientific racism. The SPLC notes he attributed stereotypes of different human populations to genetic differences, often saying that Sub-Saharan Black Africans, Papua New Guineans, and "Baltimore Blacks" possess the same genetic temperamental predispositions which he said are characterized by "violence, laziness, and a preference for 'mating instead of parenting'", while Europeans and East Asians "have evolved higher intelligence and 'tend to be more disciplined than people who take life for granted'"; that he favored mass deportation of illegal immigrants from the United States using FEMA camps as part of the process and did not believe that more money and government resources should be spent on education in the United States because he thought the race-based disparities are based on genetics rather than disparities in government funding; that he gave conferences at what the SPLC designates as white supremacist groups; and that he supported eugenics, crediting it in the form of the death penalty for the "genetic pacification" of the Western European population.

Harpending once stated that people of Sub-Saharan Black African ancestry do not have the same genetic propensity for "hard work" as Europeans and East Asians do. According to geneticist David Reich, "there is simply no scientific evidence to support this statement."

Harpending himself denied being a racist, though he acknowledged that his views would be called "racist" by others. In 2011, he delivered a lecture on race and intelligence at the H. L. Mencken Club, a white nationalist conference founded by Paul Gottfried and Richard Spencer, described by the Anti-Defamation League as a "racist gathering". In a 2012 blog post, he claimed that institutional racism and white privilege do not exist, describing them as a continuation of traditional African beliefs about witchcraft – a belief in "vague and invisible forces that are oppressing people."

== Personal life ==
Harpending's first wife was Patricia Draper, with whom he had two children. He married his second wife, Renee Pennington, around 1995. They had one son. Harpending died on April 3, 2016, at the age of 72, following a stroke.

== Selected publications ==
- Renee Pennington; Henry Harpending (1993). The Structure of an African Pastoralist Community: Demography, History, and Ecology of the Ngamiland Herero. Clarendon Press. ISBN 978-0-19-852286-7.
- Jennie Keith; Christine L. Fry; Anthony P. Glascock; Charlotte Ikels; Jeanette Dickerson-Putman; Henry C. Harpending; Patricia Draper (22 September 1994). The Aging Experience: Diversity and Commonality Across Cultures. SAGE Publications. ISBN 978-1-4522-5484-5.
- Gregory Cochran; Henry Harpending (2009). The 10,000 Year Explosion: How Civilization Accelerated Human Evolution. Basic Books. ISBN 978-0-4650-0221-4.

== See also ==
- John D. Hawks
- Ashkenazi Jewish intelligence
