= Nicholas Wade =

British science writer

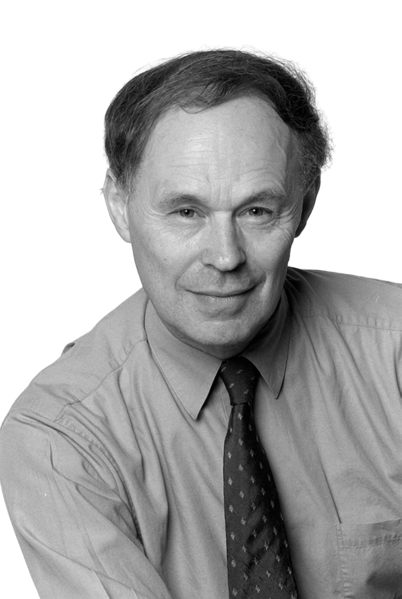
- Born: Nicholas Michael Landon Wade; 17 May 1942 (age 83); Aylesbury, England
- Education: Eton College; University of Cambridge (BA)
- Known for: A Troublesome Inheritance
- Website: www.nytimes.com/by/nicholas-wade

Nicholas Michael Landon Wade (born 17 May 1942) is a British author and journalist. He is the author of numerous books, and has served as staff writer and editor for Nature, Science, and the science section of The New York Times.

His 2014 book A Troublesome Inheritance: Genes, Race and Human History was widely denounced by the scientific community for misrepresenting research into human population genetics.

In May 2021, Wade published an article in support of the COVID-19 lab leak hypothesis, contrary to the prevailing scientific view, and fueling controversy on the origins of the virus.

== Early life and education ==
Wade was born in Aylesbury, England and educated at Eton College. He is a grandson of Lawrence Beesley, a survivor of the sinking of the Titanic. He earned a Bachelor of Arts degree in Natural Sciences from King's College, Cambridge in 1964, and immigrated to the United States in 1970.

== Career ==
Wade was a science writer and editor for the journals Nature from 1967 to 1971, and Science from 1972 to 1982. In a 1976 article in Science, Wade documented the controversy surrounding E. O. Wilson's book Sociobiology: The New Synthesis: portraying Wilson in a sympathetic light, and the opposing Sociobiology Study Group more critically.

Wade's 1977 book, The Ultimate Experiment: Man-Made Evolution, covered the then new and controversial field of gene splicing. His 1981 book, The Nobel Duel: Two Scientists' 21-Year Race to Win the World's Most Coveted Research Prize, described the competition between Andrew Schally and Roger Guillemin, whose discoveries regarding the peptide hormone led to them sharing the 1977 Nobel Prize in Physiology or Medicine. Betrayers of the Truth: Fraud and Deceit in the Halls of Science (1982), co-authored with William J. Broad, discusses historical and contemporary examples of scientific fraud. Wade joined The New York Times in 1982 as a staff and editorial writer, was appointed science and health editor in 1990; he left the Times in 2012.

In the 2000s, Wade's books began to focus on human evolution. He released Before the Dawn: Recovering the Lost History of Our Ancestors in 2006, which is about what Wade referred to as "two vanished periods" in human development, and The Faith Instinct in 2009, about the evolution of religious behaviour. In 2007, Before the Dawn received a Science in Society Journalism Award from the National Association of Science Writers.

=== A Troublesome Inheritance ===
In 2014, Wade released A Troublesome Inheritance: Genes, Race and Human History, in which he argued that human evolution has been "recent, copious, and regional" and that genes may have influenced a variety of behaviours that underpin differing forms of human society. The book has been widely denounced by scientists, including many of those upon whose work the book was based.

On 8 August 2014, The New York Times Book Review published an open letter signed by 139 senior faculty members in population genetics and evolutionary biology which read:

Wade juxtaposes an incomplete and inaccurate account of our research on human genetic differences with speculation that recent natural selection has led to worldwide differences in I.Q. test results, political institutions and economic development. We reject Wade's implication that our findings substantiate his guesswork. They do not. We are in full agreement that there is no support from the field of population genetics for Wade's conjectures.

After publication, the letter was signed by four more faculty members. In response to the letter, Wade said these scientists had misunderstood his intent.

The book was further criticised in a series of five reviews by Agustín Fuentes, Jonathan M. Marks, Jennifer Raff, Charles C. Roseman and Laura R. Stein, which were published together in the scientific journal Human Biology. Marks, for instance, described the book as "entirely derivative, an argument made from selective citations, misrepresentations, and speculative pseudoscience." Biologist H. Allen Orr called the book "lively and generally serviceable", but said it was "not [...] without error", stating that Wade had overstated the evidence for recent natural selection in the human genome.

=== COVID-19 lab leak hypothesis ===
In May 2021, Wade published a 10,000-word article on Medium and later in the Bulletin of the Atomic Scientists titled "The origin of COVID: Did people or nature open Pandora's box at Wuhan?" in which he argued that the possibility that the novel coronavirus was bioengineered and had leaked from a lab in Wuhan, China, couldn't be dismissed. Wade's article fuelled the controversy around the origins of the virus, and has become one of the most-cited pieces in support of the lab leak hypothesis. Wade's argument is at odds with the prevailing view among scientists that the virus most likely has a zoonotic origin. While some experts have supported taking the lab leak possibility seriously, the majority consider it very unlikely, unsupported by available evidence and bordering on speculation. David Gorski of Science-Based Medicine described Wade's argument as a conspiracy theory.

== See also ==
- COVID-19 misinformation
