= The Faith Instinct =

2009 book by Nicholas Wade

The Faith Instinct: How Religion Evolved and Why It Endures
- Cover
- Author: Nicholas Wade
- Language: English
- Subject: Religion
- Publisher: Penguin Books
- Publication date: 2009
- Publication place: United States
- Media type: Print (Hardcover and Paperback)
- Pages: 320
- ISBN: 978-0143118190

The Faith Instinct: How Religion Evolved and Why It Endures is a 2009 book about the evolution of religious behavior by New York Times science reporter Nicholas Wade, in which the author argues that religious behaviours have evolved through natural selection. Wade argues that religious behaviour, through shared gods and beliefs, creates social solidarity, which is the driving force in making groups of people who are not related to each other by family, comply with and enforce shared norms and rules for social behaviour, that are not beneficial on an individual level, but beneficial for the tribe as a whole. Wade argues that the selection for religious behaviour began at least 50,000 years ago between African tribes, where tribes that benefited more from the unifying power of shared gods and beliefs, music and dance, outcompeted rivals and thus left more survivors, whereby genes underlying a brain-based “faith instinct” proliferated, which caused religious tendencies to be ingrained in the human brain.
