= Encyclopedia of Evolution =

The Encyclopedia of Evolution is a print encyclopedia of evolutionary biology edited by Mark Pagel and published in 2002 by Oxford University Press.

It consists of 370 original articles written by leading experts including Richard Dawkins, Stephen Jay Gould, and Jane Goodall, and was selected as one of the Outstanding Reference Sources of 2003 by American Libraries.

A similar book, the Cambridge Encyclopedia of Evolution is edited by Steve Jones.
