= Mark Pagel =

American evolutionary biologist

- Born: Mark David Pagel; 5 June 1954 (age 72); Seattle, Washington, US
- Education: University of Washington
- Known for: Co-developer of the Comparative Method in Anthropology
- Spouse: Ruth Mace
- Children: 2
- Awards: FRS (2011)
- Scientific career
- Fields: Evolution; Evolutionary Biology; Phylogenetics; Evolutionary linguistics
- Workplaces: University of Reading; University of Oxford
- Thesis: Determinants of the Success and Failure of Ridge Regression (1980)
- Website: evolution.reading.ac.uk

Mark David Pagel FRS (born 5 June 1954 in Seattle, Washington) is an evolutionary biologist and professor. He heads the Evolutionary Biology Group at the University of Reading. He is known for comparative studies in evolutionary biology. In 1994, with his spouse, anthropologist Ruth Mace, Pagel pioneered the Comparative Method in Anthropology.

== Education ==
Pagel was a student educated at the University of Washington where he was awarded a PhD in Mathematics in 1980 for work on ridge regression.

== Research ==
During the late 1980s, Pagel worked on developing ways to analyse species relatedness, in the zoology department at the University of Oxford. Having met there, in 1994, Pagel and anthropologist Ruth Mace co-authored a paper, "The Comparative Method in Anthropology", that used phylogenetic methods to analyse human cultures, pioneering a new field of science — using evolutionary trees, or phylogenies, in anthropology, to explain human behaviour. Pagel's interests include evolution and the development of languages.

Pagel was the editor-in-chief for the Encyclopedia of Evolution, published in 2002. He authored Wired for Culture: The Natural History of Human Cooperation, which was voted one of best science books of 2012 by The Guardian. In 2019, he delivered the Gifford Lectures on Wired for Culture: The Origins of the Human Social Mind, or Why Humans Occupied the World at the University of Glasgow.

== Personal life ==
Pagel's partner is Ruth Mace, professor of Evolutionary Anthropology at University College London. Together they have two sons, the first of whom was born the same year that Pagel's and Mace's landmark work, "The Comparative Method in Anthropology", was published in Current Anthropology.

== Awards and honours ==
Pagel was elected a Fellow of the Royal Society in 2011. His nomination reads:

Mark Pagel is distinguished for having shown how a combination of phylogenetic trees of species and knowledge of their features can be used to reconstruct the evolutionary past and how it gave rise to the present. He has introduced novel statistical modeling techniques that provide solutions to outstanding problems of trait evolution. These solutions have influenced how evolutionary biologists and anthropologists conduct their science and the evolutionary questions they test. He has used his approaches to address and solve questions of fundamental importance involving speciation, adaptation, punctuational evolution and human cultural and linguistic evolution.
