= Ruth Mace =

Anthropologist, biologist, and academic

Ruth Mace FBA
- Born: 9 October 1961 (age 65); London, England
- Occupation: Anthropologist
- Title: Professor of evolutionary anthropology
- Spouse: Mark Pagel
- Children: 2

Academic background
- Education: South Hampstead High School; Westminster School
- Alma mater: Wadham College, Oxford
- Thesis: The dawn chorus: Behavioural organisation in the great tit (Parus major) (1987)

Academic work
- Discipline: Anthropology
- Sub-discipline: Evolutionary anthropology Phylogenetic approaches
- Institutions: Imperial College London; University of East Anglia; University College London

Ruth Mace FBA (born 9 October 1961) is a British anthropologist, biologist, and academic. She specialises in the evolutionary ecology of human demography and life history, and phylogenetic approaches to culture and language evolution. Since 2004, she has been Professor of Evolutionary Anthropology at University College London.

== Early life and education ==
Mace was born on 9 October 1961 in London, England to David Mace and Angela Mace. She was educated at South Hampstead High School, an all-girls private school in South Hampstead, London, and at Westminster School, an independent school within the precincts of Westminster Abbey that has a mixed-sex sixth form. She studied zoology at Wadham College, Oxford, graduating with a Bachelor of Arts (BA) degree in 1983 and a Doctor of Philosophy (DPhil) degree in 1987. Her doctoral thesis was titled "The dawn chorus: Behavioural organisation in the great tit (Parus major)".

== Academic career ==
Having completed her doctorate, Mace began her academic career as a research fellow at Imperial College London; she held a NERC Postdoctoral Fellowship. Then, from 1989 to 1991, she was a lecturer in the School of Development Studies at the University of East Anglia.

In 1991, Mace moved to the Department of Anthropology of University College London: she was a Royal Society University Research Fellow and Lecturer from 1991 to 1999, and Reader in Human Evolutionary Ecology from 1999 to 2004. In 1994, having met Mark Pagel at University College, the two co-authored "The Comparative Method in Anthropology", that used phylogenetic methods to analyse human cultures, pioneering a new field of science — using evolutionary trees, or phylogenies, in anthropology, to explain human behaviour.

In 2004, she was appointed Professor of Evolutionary Anthropology. From 2005 to 2010, she was also Editor-in-Chief of Evolution and Human Behavior. From 2018, she was the founding Editor-in-Chief of Evolutionary Human Sciences. Since 2010, she has served as Head of Biological Anthropology at University College London.

== Personal life ==
Mace's partner is Mark Pagel, professor of Evolutionary Biology at the University of Reading. Together they have two sons.

== Honours ==
In 2003, Mace gave the Curl Lecture, a prize lectureship of the Royal Anthropological Institute. In 2008, she was elected a Fellow of the British Academy (FBA), the United Kingdom's national academy for the humanities and the social sciences.

== Selected works ==
- Milner-Gulland, E. J.; Mace, Ruth (1998). Conservation of Biological Resources: with case studies contributed by other authors. Oxford: Blackwell Science. ISBN 978-0865427389.
- Mace, Ruth; Holden, Clare J.; Shennan, Stephen, eds. (2005). The Evolution of Cultural Diversity: A Phylogenetic Approach. London: UCL Press. ISBN 978-1844720996.
- Sear, Rebecca; Mace, Ruth (January 2008). "Who keeps children alive? A review of the effects of kin on child survival". Evolution and Human Behavior. 29 (1): 1–18. doi:10.1016/j.evolhumbehav.2007.10.001.
- Gillian, Bentley; Mace, Ruth, eds. (2009). Substitute Parents: Biological and Social Perspectives on Alloparenting in Human Societies. New York: Berghahn Books. ISBN 978-1845451066.
