= The Ultimate Experiment =

1977 book by Nicholas Wade

- Author: Nicholas Wade
- Language: English
- Genre: Non-fiction
- Publication date: 1977

The Ultimate Experiment: Man-Made Evolution is a 1977 book by science writer Nicholas Wade about the then-new and controversial field of recombinant DNA research ("gene splicing"), much of it drawn from his earlier news and commentary as a writer for Science. An updated edition with a new chapter was published in 1979.
