= Evolutionary Psychology (journal) =

Peer-reviewed open access academic journal

- Discipline: Psychology
- Language: English
- Edited by: Todd K. Shackelford, Bernhard Fink, David A. Puts, Rebecca Sear

Publication details
- History: 2003–present
- Publisher: SAGE Publications
- Frequency: Quarterly
- Open access: Yes
- Impact factor: 1.978 (2017)

Standard abbreviations
- ISO 4: Evol. Psychol.

Indexing
- ISSN: 1474-7049
- OCLC no.: 502561402

Links
- Journal homepage; Online access; Online archive

Evolutionary Psychology is a peer-reviewed open access academic journal published since 2003. It covers empirical, philosophical, historical, and socio-political aspects of evolutionary psychology. Its editors-in-chief are Todd K. Shackelford (Oakland University), Bernhard Fink (University of Göttingen), David A. Puts (Pennsylvania State University), and Rebecca Sear (London School of Hygiene and Tropical Medicine). In 2015 the journal moved to SAGE Publications.

The journal is abstracted and indexed in Social Sciences Citation Index, and Current Contents/Social and Behavioral Sciences.
