= Alan R. Rogers =

American anthropologist

- Born: August 13, 1950 (age 76); United States
- Education: University of New Mexico
- Spouse: Elizabeth Cashdan
- Children: 2
- Scientific career
- Fields: Population genetics Evolutionary ecology
- Workplaces: University of Utah
- Thesis: Variation of Neutral Characters in Subdivided Populations (1982)
- Doctoral advisor: Henry C. Harpending

Alan R. Rogers (born August 13, 1950) is a professor in the Department of Anthropology and adjunct professor in the Department of Biology at the University of Utah. His research is in the fields of population genetics and evolutionary ecology. He is the author of The Evidence for Evolution.

== Early life and education ==
Rogers earned a B.A. at the University of Texas at Austin and a Ph.D. at University of New Mexico, where he studied under Henry Harpending.

== Career ==
Rogers is best known for his work in population genetics, much of which uses genetic data to study the history of populations. He has also contributed to the theory of cultural evolution, to life history theory, and to economic theory on the interest rate.

== Publications ==
=== Books ===
- Rogers, A.R. 2011. The Evidence for Evolution. The University of Chicago Press, Chicago.
- Rogers, A.R. 2012. Models in Evolutionary Ecology (free ebook)

=== Selected papers ===
- Rogers, A.R. 1988. Does biology constrain culture? American Anthropologist, 90(4): 819–831.
- Rogers, A.R. 1991. Conserving resources for children. Human Nature, 2:73-82.
- Rogers, A.R. 1992. Population growth makes waves in the distribution of pairwise genetic differences. Molecular Biology and Evolution, 9:552-569.
- Rogers, A.R. 1993. Why menopause? Evolutionary ecology, 7(4):406-420.
- Rogers, A.R. 1994. The evolution of time preference by natural selection. American Economic Review, 84(3):460-481.
- Rogers, A.R. 1995. Genetic evidence for a Pleistocene population explosion. Evolution, 49(4):608-615.
- Rogers, A.R., Jorde, L.B. 1996. Ascertainment bias in estimates of average heterozygosity. American Journal of Human Genetics, 58:1033-1041.
- Harpending, H.C., Rogers, A.R. 2000. Genetic perspectives on human origins and differentiation. 1, 361–385.
- Rogers, A.R. 2000. Analysis of bone counts by maximum likelihood. Journal of Archaeological Science, 27(2):111-125.
