= The Nobel Duel =

1977 book by Nicholas Wade

- Author: Nicholas Wade
- Publisher: Anchor Press/Doubleday
- Publication date: 1981
- Pages: 321
- ISBN: 9780385149815
- OCLC: 6737217

The Nobel Duel: Two Scientists' 21-Year Race to Win the World's Most Coveted Research Prize is a 1981 book by science journalist Nicholas Wade. It describes the rivalry between scientists Andrew Schally and Roger Guillemin, whose discoveries in hormone research led to them sharing the 1977 Nobel Prize in Physiology or Medicine.

Biochemist John T. Edsall, writing in Isis, wrote "Wade appears to have striven conscientiously to give a fair picture. The book is of interest both as a study of the tumultuous course of some major scientific advances and as a contribution to the sociology of modern science." A reviewer in The New England Journal of Medicine wrote Wade had gone too far in imputing unattractive motives to the two figures. Maya Pines in The Washington Post's "Book World" said it "may be the most unflattering description of scientists ever written".

Several reviewers invoked comparisons to The Double Helix by James D. Watson, which chronicled the human side of scientific research, with a review in The Journal of the American Medical Association calling it the better of the two, although on a subject of lesser importance. A review in The American Biology Teacher wrote: "No book since... The Double Helix has captured the intensity, spirit, and drama of scientific research." Pines called it "worlds away" from The Double Helix in presenting the research as a "grim, relentless struggle for fame and glory".
