= Rebecca Sear =

British anthropologist and academic

Rebecca Sear, FBA is a British anthropologist and academic, who specialises in evolutionary anthropology, demography and human behavioural ecology. Since 2024, she has been director of the Centre for Culture and Evolution at Brunel University London. She previously taught at the London School of Economics, Durham University and the London School of Hygiene & Tropical Medicine.

Sear undertook a Doctor of Philosophy (PhD) degree in anthropology at University College London which she completed in 2001. Her doctoral thesis was titled "Evolutionary demography of a rural Gambian population".

In July 2024, she was elected Fellow of the British Academy (FBA), the United Kingdom's national academy for the humanities and social sciences.

== Views ==
Sear is a critic of scientific racism and eugenics, criticising J. Philippe Rushton and Richard Lynn for their theories like Rushton's differential K theory and Lynn's national IQ research.

== Selected works ==
- Sear, Rebecca; Mace, Ruth; McGregor, Ian A. (22 August 2000). "Maternal grandmothers improve nutritional status and survival of children in rural Gambia". Proceedings of the Royal Society of London. Series B: Biological Sciences. 267 (1453): 1641–1647. doi:10.1098/rspb.2000.1190. PMC 1690719.
- Sear, Rebecca; Steele, Fiona; McGregor, Ian A.; Mace, Ruth (2002). "The Effects of Kin on Child Mortality in Rural Gambia". Demography. 39 (1): 43–63. doi:10.2307/3088363. ISSN 0070-3370.
- Sear, Rebecca; Mace, Ruth (January 2008). "Who keeps children alive? A review of the effects of kin on child survival". Evolution and Human Behavior. 29 (1): 1–18. doi:10.1016/j.evolhumbehav.2007.10.001.
- Sear, Rebecca; Coall, David (2011). "How Much Does Family Matter? Cooperative Breeding and the Demographic Transition". Population and Development Review. 37: 81–112. ISSN 0098-7921.
- Burger, Oskar; Lee, Ronald; Sear, Rebecca, eds. (2024). Human Evolutionary Demography. Cambridge: Open Book Publishers. ISBN 978-1-80064-170-9.
