= Jennie Keith =

American anthropologist

Academic background
- Education: Pomona College
- Alma mater: University of Chicago

Academic work
- Discipline: Anthropology
- Institutions: Swarthmore College

Jennie Keith is an American anthropologist. She specializes in researching aging, and was the Centennial Professor of Anthropology, an endowed chair, at Swarthmore College.

== Early life ==
Keith graduated from Pomona College in 1964 and received her doctorate from the University of Chicago in 1968.
