= American Association of Anthropological Genetics =

Educational and scientific organization

The American Association of Anthropological Genetics (AAAG) is an educational and scientific organization founded in 1994. The association aims to promote the study of anthropological genetics and publishes Human Biology as its official scientific journal.
