= Kazimierz Schally =

Polish army general (1895–1967)

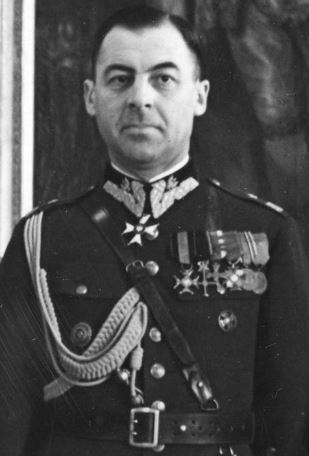
Kazimierz Schally

Kazimierz Piotr Schally (English: Casimir Peter Schally; 22 February 1895, Nowy Sącz, Galicia – 12 January 1967, Edinburgh, Scotland) was a Polish army general. He served as Chief of the Cabinet of President Ignacy Mościcki.

His son was the Polish-American endocrinologist Andrew Schally.

== Military awards ==
- Virtuti Militari
- Order of Polonia Restituta
- Cross of Independence
- Cross of Valor (four times)
- Cross of Merit (twice)
- Legion of Honour (France)
