= Todd K. Shackelford =

American psychologist

Todd Kennedy Shackelford (born 1971) is an American psychologist and professor at Oakland University. He is best known for his work in evolutionary psychology. He is the editor in chief of the academic journals Evolutionary Psychology and Evolutionary Psychological Science. He is a fellow of the American Psychological Association and the Association for Psychological Science.

== Education ==
Shackelford received his B.A. in 1993 from the University of New Mexico, his M.A. in 1995 from the University of Michigan and his Ph.D. in 1997 from the University of Texas at Austin.

== Career ==
After earning his Ph.D. he went to Florida Atlantic University. Shackelford was an assistant professor until 2002 and an associate professor until 2007. After being promoted to full professor he created the Ph.D. program in evolutionary psychology. In 2010 he moved to Oakland University where he serves as chair of the psychology department. He is a director of the Evolutionary Psychology Lab.

Shackelford has authored or co-authored over 200 articles in academic journals. His h-index as calculated by Google Scholar is 93.

== Published works ==
=== Books (edited) ===
- Shackelford, T.K. (Ed.). (2020). The SAGE Handbook of Evolutionary Psychology. Foundations of Evolutionary Psychology. London: SAGE Publications Ltd, 2021
- Shackelford, T.K., & Hansen, R.D. (Eds.). (2016). The evolution of morality. New York: Springer.
- Zeigler-Hill, V., Welling, L.L.M., & Shackelford, T.K. (Eds.). (2015). Evolutionary perspectives on social psychology. New York: Springer.
- Shackelford, T.K., & Hansen, R.D. (Eds.). (2015). The evolution of sexuality. New York: Springer.
- Weekes-Shackelford, V.A., & Shackelford, T.K. (Eds.). (2014). Evolutionary perspectives on human sexual psychology and behavior. New York: Springer.
- Shackelford, T.K., & Hansen, R.D. (Eds.). (2014). The Evolution of Violence. New York: Springer.
- Shackelford, T. K., & Weekes-Shackelford, V. A. (Eds.). (2012). The Oxford Handbook of Evolutionary Perspectives on Violence, Homicide, and War. New York: Oxford University Press.
- Shackelford, T. K., & Goetz, A.T. (2012). (Eds.). The Oxford Handbook of Sexual Conflict in Humans. New York: Oxford University Press.
- Vonk, J., & Shackelford, T. K. (2012). (Eds.). The Oxford Handbook of Comparative Evolutionary Psychology. New York: Oxford University Press.
- Salmon, C.A., & Shackelford, T. K. (2011). (Eds.). The Oxford Handbook of Evolutionary Family Psychology. New York: Oxford University Press.
- Platek, S.M., & Shackelford, T. K. (Eds.). (2009). Foundations in evolutionary cognitive neuroscience. New York: Cambridge University Press.
- Duntley, J. D., & Shackelford, T. K. (Eds.). (2008). Evolutionary forensic psychology. New York: Oxford University Press.
- Platek, S. M., Keenan, J. P., & Shackelford, T. K. (Eds.). (2007). Evolutionary cognitive neuroscience. Cambridge, Massachusetts : MIT Press.
- Salmon, C. A., & Shackelford, T. K. (Eds.). (2007). Family relationships: An evolutionary perspective. New York: Oxford University Press.
- Platek, S. M., & Shackelford, T. K. (Eds.). (2006). Female infidelity and paternal uncertainty. New York: Cambridge University Press.
- Shackelford, T. K., & Pound, N. (Eds.). (2006). Sperm competition in humans. New York: Springer.
