= Andrew Schally =

American endocrinologist (1926–2024)

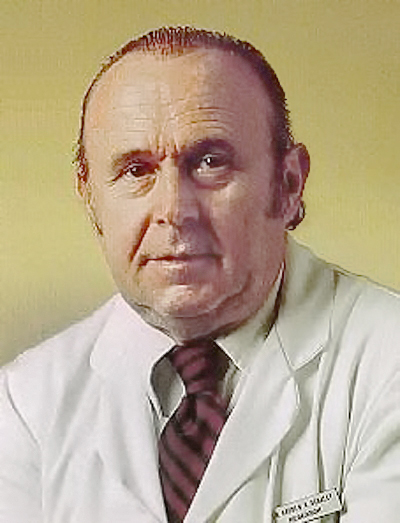
- Schally in 2000
- Born: Andrzej Viktor Schally; 30 November 1926; Wilno, Poland (now Vilnius, Lithuania)
- Died: 17 October 2024 (aged 97); Miami Beach, Florida, U.S.
- Education: McGill University (PhD)
- Medical career
- Profession: Medicine
- Institutions: Baylor College of Medicine; Tulane University; University of Miami
- Sub-specialties: Endocrinology
- Awards: Albert Lasker Award (1975); Nobel Prize in Physiology or Medicine (1977)

Andrzej Viktor "Andrew" Schally (30 November 1926 – 17 October 2024) was a Polish-American endocrinologist who was a co-recipient, with Roger Guillemin and Rosalyn Sussman Yalow, of the 1977 Nobel Prize in Physiology or Medicine.

This award recognized his research in the discovery that the hypothalamus controls hormone production and release by the pituitary gland, which controls the regulation of other hormones in the body.

Later in life, Schally utilized his knowledge of hypothalamic hormones to research possible methods for birth control and cancer treatment.

== Life and career ==
Andrzej Wiktor Schally was born in Wilno in the Second Polish Republic (now Vilnius, Lithuania) on 30 November 1926, the son of Brigadier General Kazimierz Schally, who was chief of the cabinet of President Ignacy Mościcki of Poland, and Maria (née Łącka). His great-grandfather, Jan Schally, was the mayor of Myślienice. He was of Polish, Austro-Hungarian, French, and Swedish descent.

In September 1939, when Poland was attacked by Nazi Germany and the Soviet Union, Schally escaped with Poland's President Ignacy Mościcki, the prime minister and the whole cabinet to neutral Romania, where they were interned.

Immediately after the war, in 1945, Schally moved via Italy and France to the United Kingdom where he changed his first name to Andrew. Schally received his education in Scotland and England. In 1952, he moved to Canada. He received his doctorate in endocrinology from McGill University in 1957. That same year he left for a research career in the United States where he worked principally at Tulane University.

Schally conducted research in endocrinology at the Miami Veteran's Administration Medical Center in Miami, Florida. A Canadian citizen when he left Canada, Schally became a naturalized citizen of the United States in 1962. He was affiliated with the Baylor College of Medicine for some years in Houston, Texas.

By 1966 Schally had processed 100,000 pig brains to isolate 2.8 mg of thyrotropin-releasing hormone (TRH) developing a new realm of knowledge concerning the brain's control over the body chemistry. Schally explained in his 1977 Nobel Lecture that he, alongside his researchers, further dissected 250,000 porcine hypothalami in order to isolate 5 mg more of the hormone TRH to determine its molecular structure. His work also addressed birth control methods and the effects of growth hormones on the body. Together with Roger Guillemin he described the neurohormone gonadotropin-releasing hormone (GnRH) that controls follicle-stimulating hormone (FSH) and luteinizing hormone (LH), two hormones that are integral parts of reproduction and growth and development.

Schally received an honoris causa doctors degree from the Jagiellonian University in Kraków.

Recognized as a Fellow of the Kosciuszko Foundation of Eminent Scientists of Polish Origin and Ancestry.

Schally was married to Margaret Rachel White (divorced), Ana Maria de Medeiros-Comaru (deceased), Maria de Lourdes Schally (widowed). He died at his home in Miami Beach, Florida , on 17 October 2024, at the age of 97.

== Cancer research ==
In 1981, it was demonstrated that the gonadotropin-releasing hormone (GnRH) agonistic analogs that Schally had developed between the years of 1972 and 1978 inhibited the growth of prostate cancer in rats. Alongside Dr. George Tolis, Schally conducted the first clinical trial of GnRH for patients with advanced prostate cancer in 1982. This method is now the preferred treatment for advanced prostate carcinoma. About 70% of patients with prostate cancer receive an agonist as their primary method of treatment. According to Schally, his treatment causes fewer side effects than radiation and chemotherapy. The previous method of treatment, orchiectomy or the administration of estrogens, was based on the research of Charles Brenton Huggins.

In 2004, after the death of his wife due to thyroid cancer, Schally found comfort in continuing his research.

== Awards and honors ==
- Van Meter Award of the American Thyroid Association (1969)
- Albert Lasker Award (1975)
- Nobel Prize in Physiology or Medicine (1977)
- Golden Plate Award of the American Academy of Achievement (1978)

== See also ==
- List of Poles, Biology, medicine
- List of Nobel laureates in Physiology or Medicine, laureates
- Nobel Prize in Physiology or Medicine

== Sources ==
- Aleksandra Ziółkowska, Korzenie są polskie (The Roots Are Polish), Warsaw, 1992, ISBN 83-7066-406-7.
- Aleksandra Ziolkowska-Boehm, The Roots Are Polish, Toronto, 2004, ISBN 0-920517-05-6.
- Nicholas Wade, The Nobel Duel, Garden City, Anchor Press/Doubleday, 1981.
