= Gregory Cochran =

American scientist and author

- Born: 1953 (age 72–73)
- Education: University of Illinois, Urbana-Champaign (BS, MS, PhD)
- Known for: The 10,000 Year Explosion
- Scientific career
- Fields: Physics, anthropology
- Workplaces: University of Utah

Gregory M. Cochran (born 1953) is an American physicist, anthropologist and author who argues that cultural innovation resulted in new and constantly shifting selection pressures for genetic change, thereby accelerating human evolution and divergence between human races. From 2004 to 2015, he was a research associate at the anthropology department at the University of Utah. He is co-author of the book The 10,000 Year Explosion.

== Education and career ==
Cochran has a PhD in physics. According to The Atlantic, he made a living working on "advanced optical systems" for devices and weapons.

Between 2004 and 2015 he worked as a research associate in the anthropology department at the University of Utah.

== Human evolution ==
In opposition to what he sees as the conventional wisdom that civilization has been a static environment which imposed stabilizing selection on humans, Cochran, along with like-minded anthropologists such as John D. Hawks, contends that haplotype and other data indicate the selection of genes has been strongest since the advent of farming and civilization.

=== Ashkenazi Jewish intelligence ===
Cochran and co-authors Jason Hardy and Henry Harpending suggest that the high average IQ of Ashkenazi Jews may be attributed to natural selection for intelligence during the Middle Ages and a low rate of genetic inflow. Cochran and his colleagues hypothesize that the occupational profile of the Jewish community in medieval Europe had resulted in selection pressure for mutations that increase intelligence, but can also result in hereditary neurological disorders. Cochran was featured in an episode of the Norwegian television show Hjernevask ("Brainwash") in which he discusses race and intelligence, using Ashkenazi intelligence as compared to the rest of the Israeli Jewish population as an example of differences between groups.

=== Pathogenic infections as a cause of disease ===
In 2000, Cochran and evolutionary biologist Paul W. Ewald co-authored a paper in which they proposed that most human diseases were the result of pathogenic infections (viruses, bacteria, parasites). They argue that most fitness-reducing diseases would be eliminated through natural selection, but since germs can evolve faster than humans, they are a likely culprit. Cochran and Ewald point to stomach ulcers, which were once thought to be caused by a variety of environmental factors such as smoking, diet and drugs, but were later attributed to bacteria.

==== Pathogenic hypothesis of homosexuality ====
Cochran has argued that male homosexuality is caused by an unknown pathogen because it reduces or eliminates reproductive output. He argues it is unlikely to be explained by many popular theories, because natural selection should quickly eliminate an evolutionarily disadvantageous trait. He does not suggest that the infectious agent that causes homosexuality is necessarily spread by homosexuals. One suggestion is that a widespread virus which infects everybody on the planet, only causes homosexuality in a few percent of people.

In 1999, journalist Caleb Crain published an article in the gay magazine Out in which he spoke with Cochran and several sexual orientation researchers about the hypothesis. Geneticist Dean Hamer, who had researched the genetics of homosexuality, called it "a very interesting idea" which would need to be tested by experimentation, but he was skeptical as homosexuality doesn't appear in clusters. J. Michael Bailey wanted to see evidence, but gave Cochran the "benefit of the doubt". Elaine F. Walker, who researched a pathogenic cause of schizophrenia during pregnancy, did not find it plausible.

It remains unclear what causes male homosexuality, although there is better evidence to support non-social mechanisms. The dominant hypothesis in the scientific literature is that male homosexuality may be a result of organisational effects of sex hormones on the brain during fetal development. Male homosexuality is often preceded by gender nonconforming behavior in early childhood, which according to Bailey, is "often evident by age 2".
