= Human Biology (journal) =

- Discipline: Biological anthropology Human Evolution Anthropology Human Genetics
- Language: English
- Edited by: Ripan S. Malhi

Publication details
- History: 1929–present
- Publisher: Wayne State University Press
- Frequency: Quarterly
- Impact factor: 1.061 (2018)

Standard abbreviations
- ISO 4: Hum. Biol.

Indexing
- CODEN: HUBIAA
- ISSN: 0018-7143 (print); 1534-6617 (web)
- LCCN: 31029123
- OCLC no.: 1752384

Links
- Journal homepage; Online access at BioOne; Journal page at Project MUSE

Human Biology is a peer reviewed scientific journal, currently published by Wayne State University Press. The journal was established in 1929 by Raymond Pearl and is the official publication of the American Association of Anthropological Genetics. The focus of the journal is human genetics, covering topics from human population genetics, evolutionary and genetic demography and quantitative genetics. It also covers ancient DNA studies, evolutionary biological anthropology, and research exploring biological diversity expressed in terms of adaptation. The journal also publishes interdisciplinary research linking biological and cultural diversity from evidence such sources as archaeology, ethnography and cultural anthropology studies, and more. As of February 14, 2020, the journal is on Volume 90, Issue 4. The journal's current editor is Ripan S. Malhi (University of Illinois Urbana-Champaign).

== Publication Details ==
=== Impact Factor and Other Measurements of Importance ===
According to the Journal Citation Reports, the journal has a 2018 impact factor of 1.061. For the year of 2014, the Eigenfactor, the rating of total importance of an academic journal, was 0.1. The journal has an Article Influence score of 0.5 for the year 2014. Article Influence is a ranking based on the Eigenfactor score, and is considered comparable to the Impact Factor score.

=== Online Publishing Details ===
Beginning with the February 2001 issue, Human Biology is available online through Project MUSE. Since 2006 Human Biology is also available through BioOne.
