= MCOLN3 =

Protein-coding gene in humans

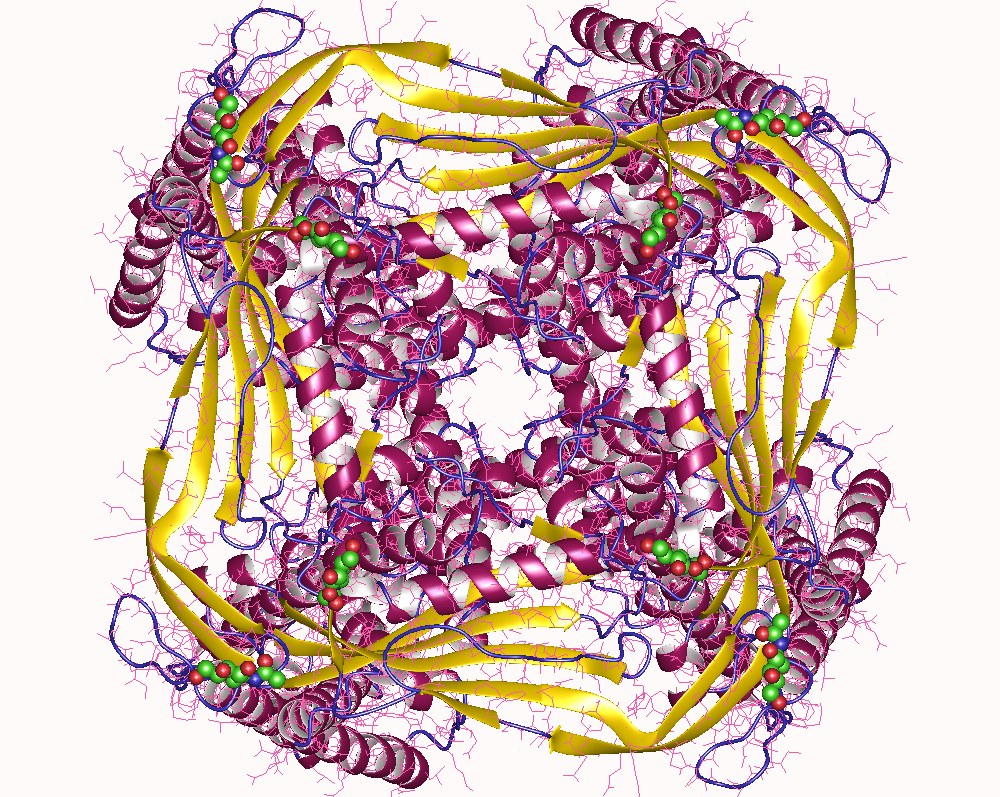

Identifiers
- Aliases: MCOLN3, TRP-ML3, TRPML3, mucolipin 3, mucolipin TRP cation channel 3
- External IDs: OMIM: 607400; MGI: 1890500; GeneCards: MCOLN3

Gene location (Human)
Chr.	Chromosome 1 (human)
Band	1p22.3	Start	85,018,082 bp
Band	1p22.3	End	85,048,500 bp

Gene location (Mouse)
Chr.	Chromosome 3 (mouse)
Band	3 H2|3 71.03 cM	Start	145,823,205 bp
Band	3 H2|3 71.03 cM	End	145,847,561 bp
RNA expression pattern
Bgee	Human / Mouse (ortholog); Top expressed in: right adrenal cortex; left adrenal gland; left adrenal cortex; corpus epididymis; germinal epithelium; pituitary gland; anterior pituitary; skin of thigh; body of pancreas; skin of hip / Top expressed in: vestibular membrane of cochlear duct; epithelium of small intestine; stria vascularis; vestibular sensory epithelium; yolk sac; utricle; iris; migratory enteric neural crest cell; medullary collecting duct; right kidney; More reference expression data
BioGPS	n/a
Gene ontology
Molecular function	calcium channel activity; lipid binding; cation channel activity; NAADP-sensitive calcium-release channel activity
Cellular component	plasma membrane; membrane; cytoplasm; integral component of membrane; autophagosome membrane; lysosome; lysosomal membrane; endosome; cytoplasmic vesicle; early endosome membrane; late endosome membrane
Biological process	inner ear auditory receptor cell differentiation; ion transport; locomotory behavior; calcium ion transmembrane transport; release of sequestered calcium ion into cytosol
Sources:Amigo / QuickGO
Orthologs
Databases	NCBI: entry; OMA: entry
Species	Human	Mouse
Entrez	55283	171166
Ensembl	ENSG00000055732	ENSMUSG00000036853
UniProt	Q8TDD5	Q8R4F0
RefSeq (mRNA)	NM_001253693; NM_018298	NM_134160
RefSeq (protein)	NP_001240622; NP_060768	NP_598921
Location (UCSC)	Chr 1: 85.02 – 85.05 Mb	Chr 3: 145.82 – 145.85 Mb
PubMed search
- Wikidata
View/Edit Human	View/Edit Mouse

Mucolipin-3 also known as TRPML3 (transient receptor potential cation channel, mucolipin subfamily, member 3) is a protein that in humans is encoded by the MCOLN3 gene. It is a member of the small family of the TRPML channels, a subgroup of the large protein family of TRP ion channels.

== Gene ==
In human, the MCOLN3 gene resides on the short arm of chromosome 1 at 1p22.3. The gene is split in 12 exons, which entail the open reading frame of 1659 nucleotides. The encoded protein, TRPML3, has 553 amino acid with a predicted molecular weight of ≈64 kDa. Computational analyses of the secondary structure predict the presence of six transmembrane domains, an ion transport motif (PF00520) and a transient receptor potential motif (PS50272). In the mouse, Mcoln3, is located on the distal end of chromosome 3 at cytogenetic band qH2. Human and mouse TRPML3 proteins share 91% sequence identity. All vertebrate species, for which a genomic sequence is available, harbor the MCOLN3 gene. Homologs of MCOLN3 are also present in the genome of insects (Drosophila melanogaster), nematodes (Caenorhabditis elegans), sea urchin (Strongylocentrotus purpuratus) and lower organisms including Hydra and Dictyostelium.

== Function ==
TRPML3 is an inwardly-rectifying cation channel.

== Phenotypes ==
Mutations of the MCOLN3 gene in mice result in auditory hair cell death and deafness.

== Ligands ==
Agonists (channel activators)

- ML-SA1 (non selective vs TRPML1)
- SN-2 (highly selective for TRPML3)

== See also ==
- transient receptor potential cation channel, mucolipin subfamily, member 1 (MCOLN1)
- transient receptor potential cation channel, mucolipin subfamily, member 2 (MCOLN2)
