= TRPML =

Protein family

TRPML (transient receptor potential cation channel, mucolipin subfamily) comprises a group of three evolutionarily related proteins that belongs to the large family of transient receptor potential ion channels. The three proteins TRPML1, TRPML2 and TRPML3 are encoded by the mucolipin-1 (MCOLN1), mucolipin-2 (MCOLN2) and mucolipin-3 (MCOLN3) genes, respectively.

The three members of the TRPML ("ML" for mucolipin) sub-family are not extremely well characterized. TRPML1 is known to be localized in late endosomes. This subunit also contains a lipase domain between its S1 and S2 segments. While the function of this domain is unknown it has been proposed that it is involved in channel regulation. Physiological studies have described TRPML1 channels as proton leak channels in lysosomes responsible for preventing these organelles from becoming too acidic. TRPML2 and TRPML3 more poorly characterized than TRPML1.

Deficiencies can lead to enlarged vesicles.

== Genes ==
- MCOLN1 (TRPML1)
- MCOLN2 (TRPML2)
- MCOLN3 (TRPML3)
