= MCOLN1 =

Protein-coding gene in the species Homo sapiens

Identifiers
- Aliases: MCOLN1, MG-2, ML4, MLIV, MST080, MSTP080, TRP-ML1, TRPM-L1, TRPML1, mucolipin 1, ML1, mucolipin TRP cation channel 1
- External IDs: OMIM: 605248; MGI: 1890498; GeneCards: MCOLN1

Gene location (Human)
Chr.	Chromosome 19 (human)
Band	19p13.2	Start	7,522,624 bp
Band	19p13.2	End	7,534,009 bp

Gene location (Mouse)
Chr.	Chromosome 8 (mouse)
Band	8 A1.1|8 1.92 cM	Start	3,550,457 bp
Band	8 A1.1|8 1.92 cM	End	3,565,232 bp
RNA expression pattern
Bgee	Human / Mouse (ortholog); Top expressed in: spleen; right adrenal cortex; left adrenal gland; left adrenal cortex; pituitary gland; stromal cell of endometrium; anterior pituitary; granulocyte; right lung; upper lobe of left lung / Top expressed in: neural layer of retina; primary visual cortex; superior frontal gyrus; yolk sac; right kidney; muscle of thigh; lip; cerebellar cortex; dentate gyrus of hippocampal formation granule cell; tail of embryo; More reference expression data
BioGPS	n/a
Gene ontology
Molecular function	cation channel activity; NAADP-sensitive calcium-release channel activity; iron ion transmembrane transporter activity; calcium channel activity; protein binding; lipid binding; intracellular phosphatidylinositol-3,5-bisphosphate-sensitive cation channel activity; ligand-gated calcium channel activity
Cellular component	lysosomal membrane; endosome membrane; integral component of membrane; integral component of plasma membrane; membrane; receptor complex; endosome; late endosome membrane; plasma membrane; cytosol; phagocytic cup; lysosome; late endosome; phagocytic vesicle membrane; cytoplasmic vesicle; cell projection; cytoplasmic vesicle membrane
Biological process	calcium ion transport; transferrin transport; release of sequestered calcium ion into cytosol; ion transport; cation transport; iron ion transmembrane transport; autophagosome maturation; calcium ion transmembrane transport; transport; adaptive immune response; immune system process; calcium-mediated signaling; protein homotetramerization; cellular response to calcium ion; cellular response to pH; cation transmembrane transport
Sources:Amigo / QuickGO
Orthologs
Databases	NCBI: entry; OMA: entry
Species	Human	Mouse
Entrez	57192	94178
Ensembl	ENSG00000090674	ENSMUSG00000004567
UniProt	Q9GZU1	Q99J21
RefSeq (mRNA)	NM_020533	NM_053177
RefSeq (protein)	NP_065394	NP_444407
Location (UCSC)	Chr 19: 7.52 – 7.53 Mb	Chr 8: 3.55 – 3.57 Mb
PubMed search
- Wikidata
View/Edit Human	View/Edit Mouse

Mucolipin-1 (ML1) also known as TRPML1 (transient receptor potential cation channel, mucolipin subfamily, member 1) is a protein that in humans is encoded by the MCOLN1 gene. It is a member of the small family of the TRPML channels, a subgroup of the large protein family of TRP ion channels.

TRPML1 is a 65 kDa protein associated with mucolipidosis type IV. Its predicted structure includes six transmembrane domains, a transient receptor potential (TRP) cation-channel domain, and an internal channel pore. TRPML1 is believed to channel iron ions across the endosome/lysosome membrane into the cell and so its malfunction causes cellular iron deficiency. It is important in lysosome function and plays a part in processes such as vesicular trafficking, exocytosis and autophagy.

== Ligands ==
Agonists

- ML-SA1
- MK6-83

== See also ==
- transient receptor potential cation channel, mucolipin subfamily, member 2 (MCOLN2)
- transient receptor potential cation channel, mucolipin subfamily, member 3 (MCOLN3)
- mucolipidosis type IV
- TRPML
