= Mucolipidosis type IV =

- Other names: Sialolipidosis, ML4, MLIV
- Specialty: Neurology, Ophthalmology
- Symptoms: Psyochomotor retardation; corneal opacity; retinal degradation; agenesis of the corpus callosum; achlorhydria
- Usual onset: Within first year of life
- Duration: Stable 2-3 devades after onset; progression slow
- Causes: MCOLN1 gene mutations; defective cation channel
- Treatment: Iron supplements (anemia); corneal transplantation
- Frequency: Under-diagnosed; carrier frequency 1:100

Mucolipidosis type IV (ML IV, ganglioside sialidase deficiency, or ML4) is an autosomal recessive lysosomal storage disorder. Individuals with the disorder have many symptoms including delayed psychomotor development and various ocular aberrations. The disorder is caused by mutations in the MCOLN1 gene, which encodes a non-selective cation channel, mucolipin1. These mutations disrupt cellular functions and lead to a neurodevelopmental disorder through an unknown mechanism. Researchers dispute the physiological role of the protein product and which ion it transports.

== Signs and symptoms ==
Most patients with ML IV show psychomotor retardation (i.e., delayed development of movement and coordination), corneal opacity, retinal degeneration and other ophthalmological abnormalities. Other symptoms include agenesis of the corpus callosum, iron deficiency resulting from an absence of acid secretion in the stomach, achlorhydria. Achlorhydria in these patients results in an increase in blood gastrin levels. These symptoms typically manifest early in life (within the first year). After disease onset there occurs a period of stability, typically lasting two to three decades during which very little disease progression occurs.

== Pathophysiology ==
Mucolipidosis type IV has an autosomal recessive pattern of inheritance.

Mucolipin1 is thought to be localized in endosomes. An important property of mucolipin1 is that decreasing pH (acidification) results in deactivation of the protein, likely through an assembly defect. There are at least 29 known mutations in MCOLN1, located throughout the gene. Many of the known mutations result in no expression of mucolipin1. Milder mutations, such as ΔF408 and V446L, produce a dysfunctioning form of the cation channel. Mutations that alter only the C-terminal of the protein also result in a mild phenotype of the disorder, usually sparing the brain. ML IV causes affected cells to accumulate auto-fluorescent vacuoles considered to be aberrant lysosomes. Several evidences exist for a defect in both exocytosis and endocytosis. There are conflicting indications of abnormal lysosomal pH in MLIV. It is not yet clear why these abnormalities will cause incomplete development of the brain, achlorhydria, and failure in the maintenance of retinal tissue.

== Diagnosis ==
Diagnosis includes genetic testing and Gastrin blood test to check for low iron in the blood.

== Treatment ==
There is no specific treatment to this disorder. However, several symptoms may be alleviated. For instance, anemia is treated by iron supplements. Some of the movement deficiencies may be corrected with orthopedic intervention. The corneal clouding can be, at least, temporarily corrected by corneal transplantation. See the equivalent section in the main mucolipidosis article.

== Epidemiology ==
Mucolipidosis type IV is severely under-diagnosed. It is often misdiagnosed as cerebral palsy. In the Ashkenazi Jewish population there are two severe mutations with a higher carrier frequency of 1:90 to 1:100.
