= MCOLN2 =

Protein-coding gene in humans

Identifiers
- Aliases: MCOLN2, TRP-ML2, TRPML2, mucolipin 2, mucolipin TRP cation channel 2
- External IDs: OMIM: 607399; MGI: 1915529; GeneCards: MCOLN2

Gene location (Human)
Chr.	Chromosome 1 (human)
Band	1p22.3	Start	84,925,583 bp
Band	1p22.3	End	84,997,113 bp

Gene location (Mouse)
Chr.	Chromosome 3 (mouse)
Band	3|3 H2	Start	145,855,588 bp
Band	3|3 H2	End	145,901,268 bp
RNA expression pattern
Bgee	Human / Mouse (ortholog); Top expressed in: tibia; cartilage tissue; rectum; mucosa of transverse colon; lymph node; right adrenal cortex; mucosa of ileum; granulocyte; left adrenal gland; secondary oocyte / Top expressed in: Ileal epithelium; yolk sac; duodenum; spleen; stroma of bone marrow; mesenteric lymph nodes; jejunum; colon; embryo; left colon; More reference expression data
BioGPS	n/a
Gene ontology
Molecular function	calcium channel activity; cation channel activity; NAADP-sensitive calcium-release channel activity
Cellular component	integral component of membrane; membrane; lysosome; lysosomal membrane; endosome; plasma membrane; late endosome membrane; recycling endosome membrane; recycling endosome
Biological process	ion transport; adaptive immune response; immune system process; calcium ion transport; protein transport; innate immune response; calcium ion transmembrane transport; positive regulation of chemokine production; protein complex oligomerization; positive regulation of monocyte chemotactic protein-1 production; positive regulation of macrophage inflammatory protein 1 alpha production; positive regulation of chemokine (C-C motif) ligand 5 production; macrophage migration; neutrophil migration; positive regulation of chemokine (C-X-C motif) ligand 2 production; release of sequestered calcium ion into cytosol
Sources:Amigo / QuickGO
Orthologs
Databases	NCBI: entry; OMA: entry
Species	Human	Mouse
Entrez	255231	68279
Ensembl	ENSG00000153898	ENSMUSG00000011008
UniProt	Q8IZK6	Q8K595
RefSeq (mRNA)	NM_153259; NM_001330647	NM_001005846; NM_026656
RefSeq (protein)	NP_001317576; NP_694991	NP_001005846; NP_080932
Location (UCSC)	Chr 1: 84.93 – 85 Mb	Chr 3: 145.86 – 145.9 Mb
PubMed search
- Wikidata
View/Edit Human	View/Edit Mouse

Mucolipin-2 also known as TRPML2 (transient receptor potential cation channel, mucolipin subfamily, member 2) is a protein that in humans is encoded by the MCOLN2 gene. It is a member of the small family of the TRPML channels, a subgroup of the large protein family of TRP ion channels.

TRPML2 is associated with the Arf6-regulated trafficking pathway and is involved in the intracellular transport of membranes and membrane proteins.

== See also ==
- transient receptor potential cation channel, mucolipin subfamily, member 1 (MCOLN1)
- transient receptor potential cation channel, mucolipin subfamily, member 3 (MCOLN3)
- TRPML
