= HEK 293 cells =

Cell line derived from human embryonic kidney cells

Human embryonic kidney 293 cells, also often referred to as HEK 293, HEK-293, 293 cells, are an immortalised cell line derived from HEK cells isolated from a female fetus in the 1970s.

The HEK 293 cell line has been widely used in research for decades due to its reliable and fast growth and propensity for transfection. The cell line is used by the biotechnology industry to produce therapeutic proteins and viruses for gene therapy as well as safety testing for a vast array of chemicals.

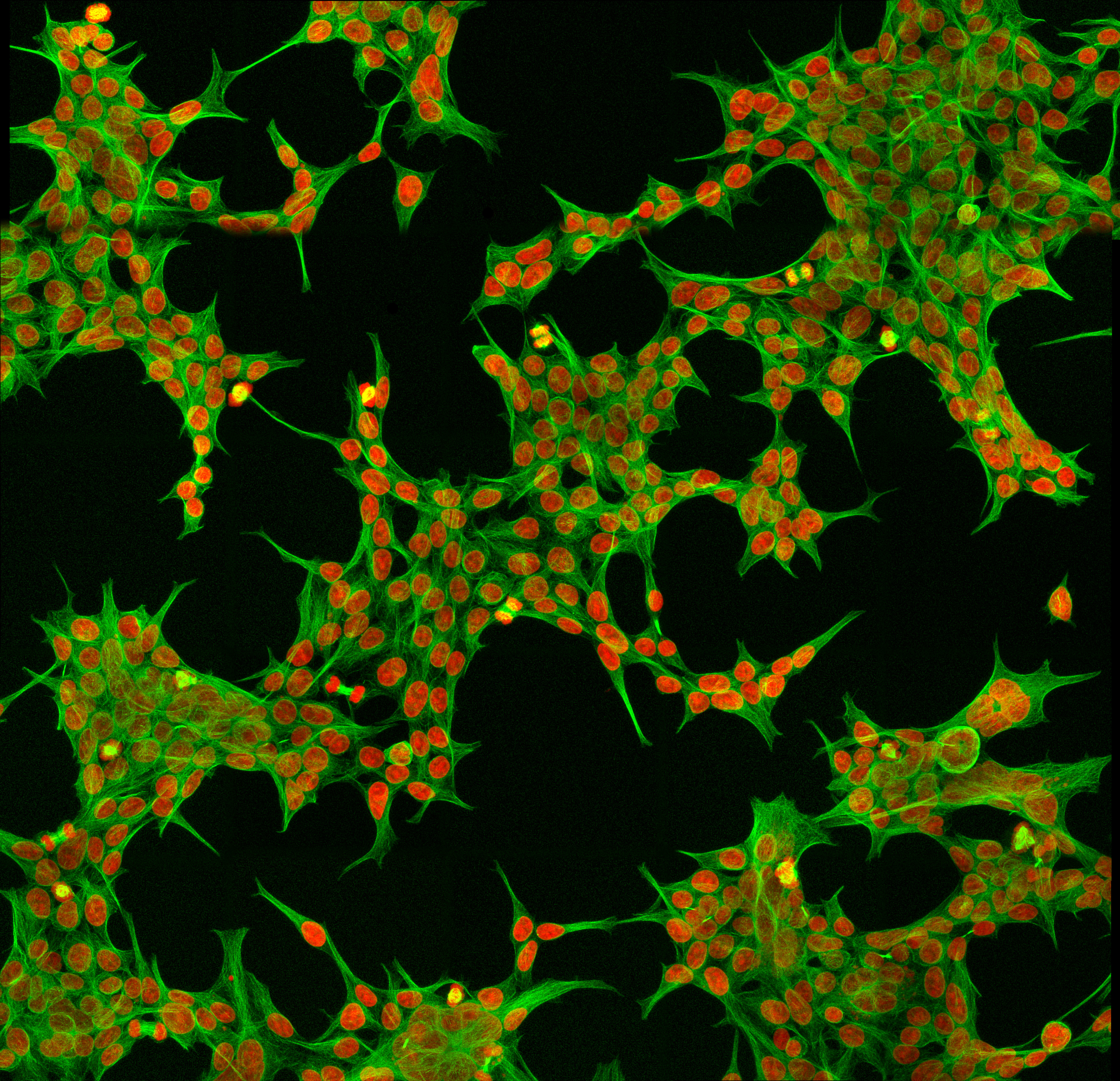
HEK-293 Cells. The nuclei are marked red with fluorescents.

== History ==
HEK 293 cells were generated in 1973 by transfection of cultures of normal human embryonic kidney cells with sheared adenovirus 5 DNA in Alex van der Eb's laboratory in Leiden, the Netherlands. The cells were obtained from a single, aborted or miscarried fetus, the precise origin of which is unclear. The cells were cultured by van der Eb; the transfection with adenoviral DNA was performed by Frank Graham, a post-doc in van der Eb's lab. They were published in 1977 after Graham left Leiden for McMaster University. They are called HEK since they originated in human embryonic kidney cultures, while the number 293 came from Graham's habit of numbering his experiments; the original HEK 293 cell clone was from his 293rd experiment. Graham performed the transfection a total of eight times, obtaining just one clone of cells that were cultured for several months. After presumably adapting to tissue culture, cells from this clone developed into the relatively stable HEK 293 line.

Subsequent analysis has shown that the transformation was brought about by inserting ~4.5 kilobases from the left arm of the adenoviral genome, which became incorporated into human chromosome 19.

For many years it was assumed that HEK 293 cells were generated by transformation of either a fibroblastic, endothelial or epithelial cell, all of which are abundant in kidneys. However, the original adenovirus transformation was inefficient, suggesting that the cell that finally produced the HEK 293 line may have been unusual in some fashion. Graham and coworkers provided evidence that HEK 293 cells and other human cell lines generated by adenovirus transformation of human embryonic kidney cells have many properties of immature neurons, suggesting that the adenovirus preferentially transformed a neuronal lineage cell in the original kidney culture.

A comprehensive study of the genomes and transcriptomes of HEK 293 and five derivative cell lines compared the HEK 293 transcriptome with that of human kidney, adrenal, pituitary and central nervous tissue. The HEK 293 pattern most closely resembled that of adrenal cells, which have many neuronal properties. Given the location of the adrenal gland (adrenal means "next to the kidney"), a few adrenal cells could plausibly have appeared in an embryonic kidney derived culture, and could be preferentially transformed by adenovirus. Adenoviruses transform neuronal lineage cells much more efficiently than typical human kidney epithelial cells. An embryonic adrenal precursor cell therefore seems the most likely origin cell of the HEK 293 line. As a consequence, HEK 293 cells should not be used as an in vitro model of typical kidney cells.

HEK 293 cells have a complex karyotype, exhibiting two or more copies of each chromosome and with a modal chromosome number of 64. They are described as hypotriploid, containing less than three times the number of chromosomes of a haploid human gamete. Chromosomal abnormalities include a total of three copies of the X chromosomes and four copies of chromosome 17 and chromosome 22. The presence of multiple X chromosomes and the lack of any trace of Y chromosome derived sequence suggest that the source fetus was female.

The 293T cell line was created in Michele Calos's lab at Stanford by stable transfection of the HEK 293 cell line with a plasmid encoding a temperature-sensitive mutant of the SV40 large T antigen; it was originally referred to as 293/tsA1609neo. The first reference to the cell line as "293T" may be its use to create the BOSC23 packaging cell line for producing retroviral particles.

== Variants ==
Multiple variants of HEK 293 have been reported.

- HEK 293
- HEK 293F
- HEK 293FT
- HEK 293T
- HEK 293TN
- HEK 293S
- HEK 293FTM
- HEK 293SG
- HEK 293SGGD
- HEK 293H
- HEK 293E
- HEK EBNA1-6E
- HEK 293MSR
- HEK 293A
- HEK293-ENT1KO

=== HEK 293T ===
The transfection used to create 293T (involving plasmid pRSV-1609) conferred neomycin/G418 resistance and expression of the tsA1609 allele of SV40 large T antigen; this allele is fully active at 33 °C (its permissive temperature), has substantial function at 37 °C, and is inactive at 40 °C. 293T is very efficiently transfected with DNA (like its parent HEK 293). Due to the expression of SV40 large T antigen, transfected plasmid DNAs that carry the SV40 origin of replication can replicate in 293T and will transiently maintain a high copy number; this can greatly increase the amount of recombinant protein or retrovirus that can be produced from the cells.

The full genome sequences of three different isolates of 293T have been determined. They are quite similar to each other but show detectable divergence from the parental HEK 293 cell line.

=== HEK293-ENT1KO ===
This mutant strain does not express of the equilibrative nucleoside transporter ENT1. The gene was knocked out using CRISPR-CAS9 and the cell line retains ENT2 expression.

== Applications ==
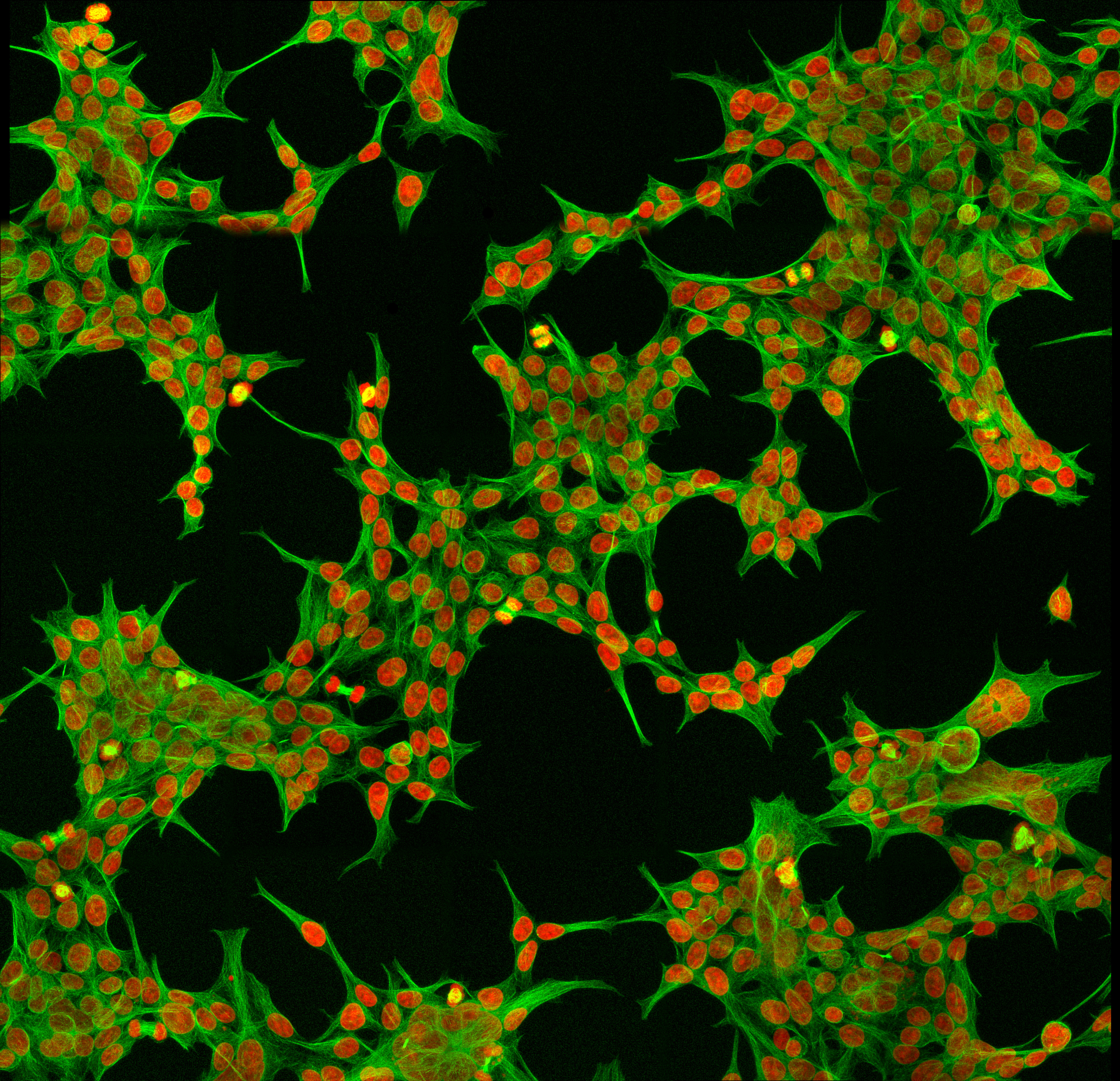
Immunofluorescent HEK 293 cells

HEK 293 cells are straightforward to grow in culture and to transfect. They have been used as hosts for gene expression. Typically, these experiments involve transfecting in a gene (or combination of genes) of interest, and then analyzing the expressed protein. The widespread use of this cell line is due to its transfectability by the various techniques, including calcium phosphate method, achieving efficiencies approaching 100%.

Examples of such experiments include:

- Effects of a drug on sodium channels
- Inducible RNA interference system
- Isoform-selective protein kinase C agonist
- Interaction between two proteins
- Nuclear export signal in a protein

HEK 293 cells were adapted to grow in suspension culture, as opposed to proliferation on plastic plates, in 1985. This enabled the growth of large amounts of recombinant adenovirus vectors.

A more specific use of HEK 293 cells is in the propagation of adenoviral vectors. Viruses offer an efficient means of delivering genes into cells, which they evolved to do, and are thus of great use as experimental tools. However, as pathogens, they also present a risk to the experimenter. This danger can be avoided by the use of viruses which lack key genes, and which are thus unable to replicate after entering a cell. In order to propagate such viral vectors, a cell line that expresses the missing genes is required. Since HEK 293 cells express a number of adenoviral genes, they can be used to propagate adenoviral vectors in which these genes (typically, E1 and E3) are deleted, such as AdEasy. However, homologous recombination between the inserted cellular Ad5 sequence and the vector sequence, although rare, can restore the replication capacity to the vector.

An important variant of this cell line is the 293T cell line. It contains the SV40 large T-antigen that allows for episomal replication of transfected plasmids containing the SV40 origin of replication. This allows for amplification of transfected plasmids and extended temporal expression of desired gene products. HEK 293, and especially HEK 293T, cells are commonly used for the production of various retroviral vectors. Various retroviral packaging cell lines are also based on these cells.

== Native proteins of interest ==
Depending on various conditions, the gene expression of HEK 293 cells may vary. The following proteins of interest (among many others) are commonly found in untreated HEK 293 cells:

- Corticotrophin releasing factor type 1 receptor
- Sphingosine-1-phosphate receptors EDG1, EDG3 and EDG5
- Muscarinic acetylcholine receptor M3
- Transient receptor potential TRPC1, TRPC3, TRPC4, TRPC6

== Bioethics ==
Alvin Wong, a Catholic bioethicist, argues that despite the uncertainty over the origin of the embryonic cells used to obtain the cell line, one can infer that it came from a voluntary abortion. To some, this may present an ethical dilemma for using HEK 293 and derivative products, such as vaccines and many medications.

On 21 December 2020, the Catholic Congregation for the Doctrine of the Faith stated that the moral duty to avoid vaccines made from cell lines derived from fetuses is, "not obligatory if there is grave danger, such as the otherwise uncontainable spread of a serious pathological event -- in this case, the pandemic spread of SARS-CoV-2 virus that causes Covid-19". The statement then justifies the use of other vaccines, "all vaccinations recognized as clinically safe and effective can be used in good conscience..."

During the COVID-19 pandemic, anti-vaccination activists noted that HEK 293 cells are used in the manufacturing of the Oxford–AstraZeneca COVID-19 vaccine (AKA AZD1222). The cells are filtered out of the final products.

Regeneron Pharmaceuticals, the maker of REGN-COV2, a therapeutic antibody cocktail used to alleviate symptoms of patients with COVID-19, did not use HEK 293T cells to produce the antibody cocktail but did use those cells to assess the potency of the drug.

In response to ethical concerns of vaccine production, several strategies for clinicians to discuss with their patients have been suggested.
