= TRPC5 =

Protein-coding gene in the species Homo sapiens

Identifiers
- Aliases: TRPC5, PPP1R159, TRP5, transient receptor potential cation channel subfamily C member 5
- External IDs: OMIM: 300334; MGI: 109524; GeneCards: TRPC5

Gene location (Human)
| Chr. | X chromosome (human) |
| Band | Xq23 | Start | 111,768,011 bp |
| Band | Xq23 | End | 112,082,776 bp |

Gene location (Mouse)
| Chr. | X chromosome (mouse) |
| Band | X F2|X 65.49 cM | Start | 143,164,667 bp |
| Band | X F2|X 65.49 cM | End | 143,471,176 bp |
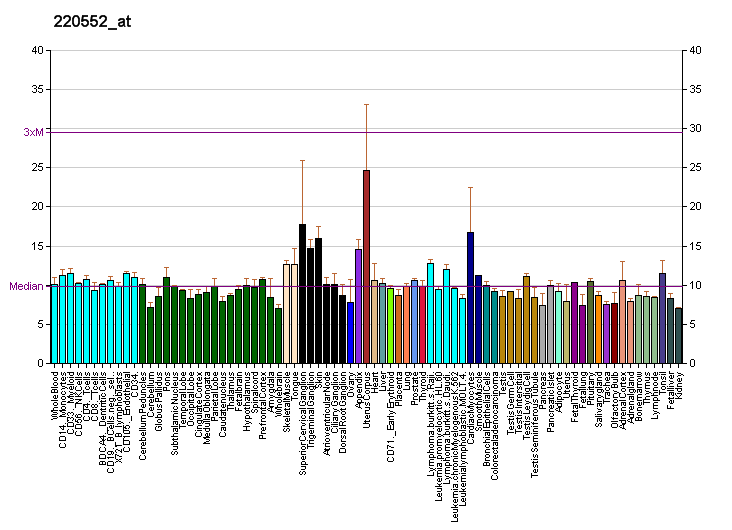
RNA expression pattern
| Bgee | Human / Mouse (ortholog); Top expressed in: testicle; gonad; prefrontal cortex; gastric mucosa; ganglionic eminence; liver; Brodmann area 9; primary visual cortex; hypothalamus; right lobe of liver / Top expressed in: supraoptic nucleus; lumbar subsegment of spinal cord; dentate gyrus of hippocampal formation granule cell; zygote; lateral hypothalamus; primary visual cortex; ventromedial nucleus; superior frontal gyrus; secondary oocyte; dorsomedial hypothalamic nucleus; More reference expression data |
| BioGPS | More reference expression data |
Gene ontology
| Molecular function | inositol 1,4,5 trisphosphate binding; ion channel activity; store-operated calcium channel activity; protein binding; calcium channel activity; clathrin binding; actin binding; actinin binding; ATPase binding |
| Cellular component | integral component of membrane; plasma membrane; integral component of plasma membrane; calcium channel complex; membrane; cytoplasm; growth cone; soma; dendrite; membrane raft; cation channel complex |
| Biological process | manganese ion transport; ion transport; regulation of cytosolic calcium ion concentration; calcium ion transmembrane transport; calcium ion transport; nervous system development; regulation of membrane hyperpolarization; positive regulation of peptidyl-threonine phosphorylation; positive regulation of axon extension; positive regulation of cell population proliferation; positive regulation of cytosolic calcium ion concentration; neuron differentiation; positive regulation of neuron differentiation; negative regulation of dendrite morphogenesis; transmembrane transport |
Sources:Amigo / QuickGO
Orthologs
| Databases | NCBI: entry; OMA: entry |
| Species | Human | Mouse |
| Entrez | 7224 | 22067 |
| Ensembl | ENSG00000072315 | ENSMUSG00000041710 |
| UniProt | Q9UL62 | Q9QX29 |
| RefSeq (mRNA) | NM_012471 | NM_009428 |
| RefSeq (protein) | NP_036603 | NP_033454 |
| Location (UCSC) | Chr X: 111.77 – 112.08 Mb | Chr X: 143.16 – 143.47 Mb |
| PubMed search |
- Wikidata
| View/Edit Human | View/Edit Mouse |

Short transient receptor potential channel 5 (TrpC5) also known as transient receptor protein 5 (TRP-5) is a protein that in humans is encoded by the TRPC5 gene. TrpC5 is subtype of the TRPC family of mammalian transient receptor potential ion channels.

== Function ==
TrpC5 is one of the seven mammalian TRPC (transient receptor potential canonical) proteins. TrpC5 is a multi-pass membrane protein and is thought to form a receptor-activated non-selective calcium permeant cation channel. The protein is active alone or as a heteromultimeric assembly with TRPC1, TRPC3, and TRPC4. It also interacts with multiple proteins including calmodulin, CABP1, enkurin, Na^{+}–H^{+} exchange regulatory factor (NHERF), interferon-induced GTP-binding protein (MX1), ring finger protein 24 (RNF24), and SEC14 domain and spectrin repeat-containing protein 1 (SESTD1).

TRPC4 and TRPC5 have been implicated in the mechanism of mercury toxicity and neurological behavior. It was established in 2021 that TRPC5 is a component of the dental cold sensing system.

== Activation ==
Homomultimeric TRPC5 and heteromultimeric TRPC5-TRPC1 channels are activated by extracellular reduced thioredoxin. This channel has also been found to be involved in the action of anaesthetics such as chloroform, halothane and propofol.

== Interactions ==
TRPC5 has been shown to interact with STMN3, TRPC1, and TRPC4.

== See also ==
- TRPC
