= GSK417651A =

Chemical compound

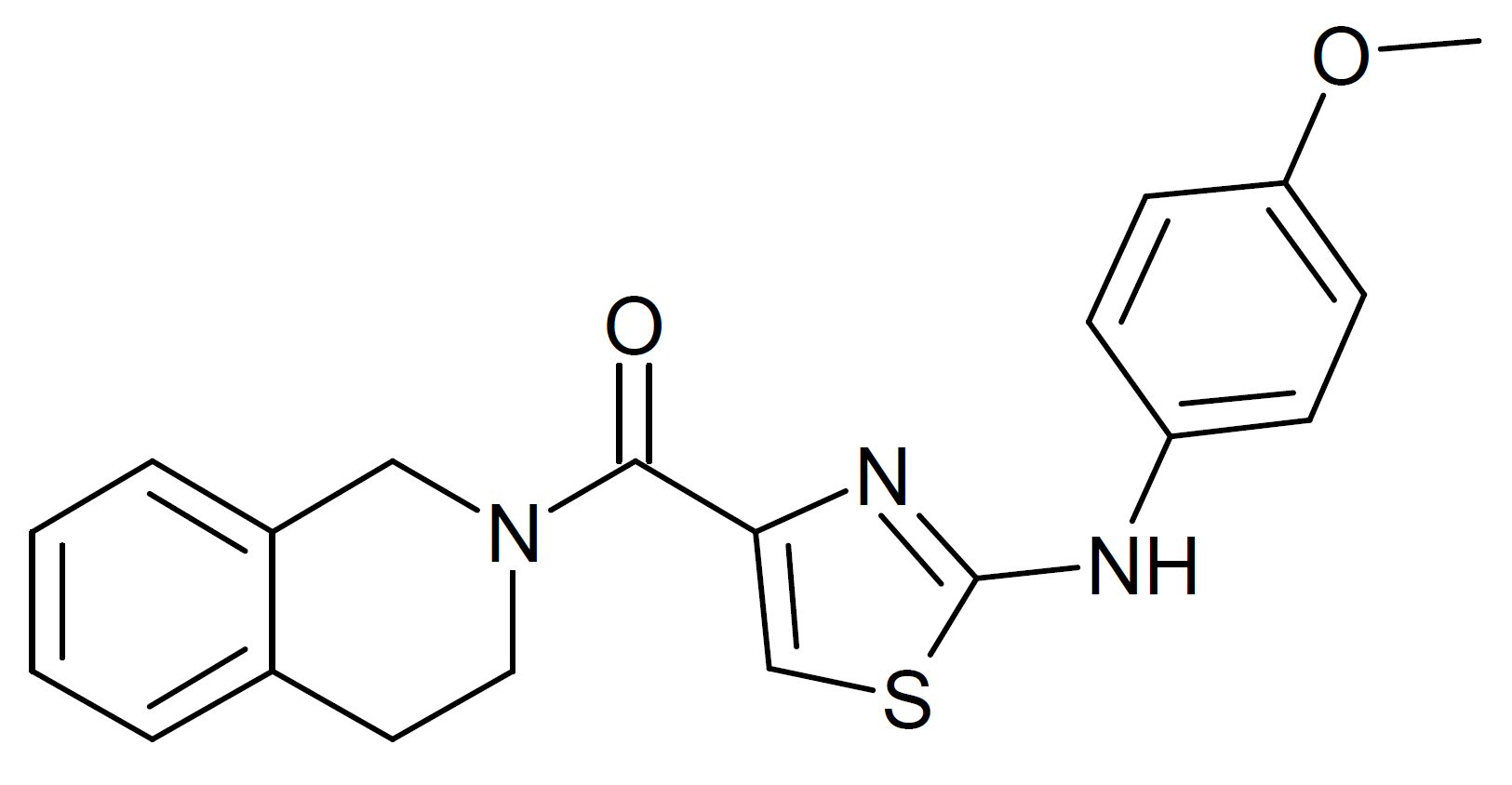

Identifiers
- IUPAC name: 3,4-dihydro-1H-isoquinolin-2-yl-[2-(4-methoxyanilino)-1,3-thiazol-4-yl]methanone
- CAS Number: 736945-96-3
- PubChem CID: 1096735
- IUPHAR/BPS: 10279
- ChemSpider: 935210
- UNII: WV82DEG4YA
- ChEMBL: ChEMBL1506485
- CompTox Dashboard (EPA): DTXSID701336625

Chemical and physical data
- Formula: C_{20}H_{19}N_{3}O_{2}S
- Molar mass: 365.45 g·mol^{−1}
- 3D model (JSmol): Interactive image
- SMILES: COC1=CC=C(C=C1)NC2=NC(=CS2)C(=O)N3CCC4=CC=CC=C4C3
- InChI: InChI=1S/C20H19N3O2S/c1-25-17-8-6-16(7-9-17)21-20-22-18(13-26-20)19(24)23-11-10-14-4-2-3-5-15(14)12-23/h2-9,13H,10-12H2,1H3,(H,21,22); Key:NTXBDULODNTCKP-UHFFFAOYSA-N

GSK417651A is a chemical compound which acts as a blocker of the TRPC family of calcium channels, with selectivity for the TRPC3 and TRPC6 subtypes. It has been used to investigate the role of TRPC3/6 channels in heart function.
