= TRPN =

Family of transport proteins

TRPN is a member of the transient receptor potential channel family of ion channels, which is a diverse group of proteins thought to be involved in mechanoreception. The TRPN gene was given the name no mechanoreceptor potential C (nompC) when it was first discovered in fruit flies, hence the N in TRPN. Since its discovery in fruit flies, TRPN homologs have been discovered and characterized in worms, frogs, and zebrafish.

== Structure ==
A structure of NOMPC was published in 2017, solved using electron cryo-microscopy. X-ray crystallography studies of channel segments cloned from fruit flies and zebrafish have led to the hypothesis that multiple ankyrin repeats at TRPN's N-terminus are involved in the gating of the channel pore. Crystallography studies of TRPY1, a yeast TRP homolog, have shown that aromatic residues conserved across TRP family members, including TRPN, in the sixth transmembrane domain are critical to the gating mechanism as well.

== Function ==
As a mechanoreceptor, TRPN responds to impinging mechanical forces. Studies in TRPN deficient adult fruit flies and larvae have shown that these null mutants have severe difficulty moving, which suggests a role for TRPN in proprioception. This hypothesis is further strengthened by immunostaining studies in fruit flies that have shown TRPN localization in the cilia of campaniform sensilla and chordotonal organs in Johnston's organ. Further immunostaining studies in fruit flies have identified, with higher resolution techniques, that TRPN is localized at the distal end of motile mechanosensory cilia in Johnston's organ. However, TRPN is not required for transduction of mechanical stimuli in larvae or adult flies, suggesting that the TRPV channels nanchung and inactive may also serve a mechanosensory function.

Studies in worms have shown that TRPN mutants have locomotion defects, as well as a decreased basal slowing response, which is a reduction in rate of motion that is induced by contact with a food source. This result further strengthens the hypothesis that TRPN is vital to proprioception. Electrophysiological studies of single channels in worms have shown that TRPN responds to mechanical stimuli and has a preference for sodium ions, although a complete ion selectivity profile has yet to be identified.

Studies in zebrafish larvae have also shown that morpholino-mediated knockdown of TRPN function result in deafness as well as imbalance, suggesting a dual role in hearing as well as proprioception. Immunostaining studies in frog embryos have shown localization of TRPN at the tips of mechanosensory cilia in the lateral line, hair cells and ciliated epidermal cells, suggesting a role in a variety of mechanosensory functions. TRPN localizes to the kinocilia, not stereocilia, of amphibian hair cells, suggesting the presence of two distinct classes of mechanosensitive channel.

TRPN has the capability of performing a variety of roles in mechanosensory systems.

== Genes ==
Genomic data from a variety of organisms show that TRPN is present in most animals, but it is absent in all amniotes. In most animals the number of ankyrin repeats is between 28 and 29.

The following is a list of genes encoding TRPN organized by the organism in which they are found. Gene names are specific to the organism and to the way in which they were discovered, which is why the gene name may not explicitly be "TRPN". Links to the NCBI Gene database are included whenever possible.

=== Fruit fly (Drosophila melanogaster) ===
- nompC

=== Nematode worm (Caenorhabditis elegans) ===
- trp-4

=== African clawed frog (Xenopus laevis) ===
- nompc

=== Zebrafish (Danio rerio) ===
- trpn1
