= GSK1702934A =

Chemical compound

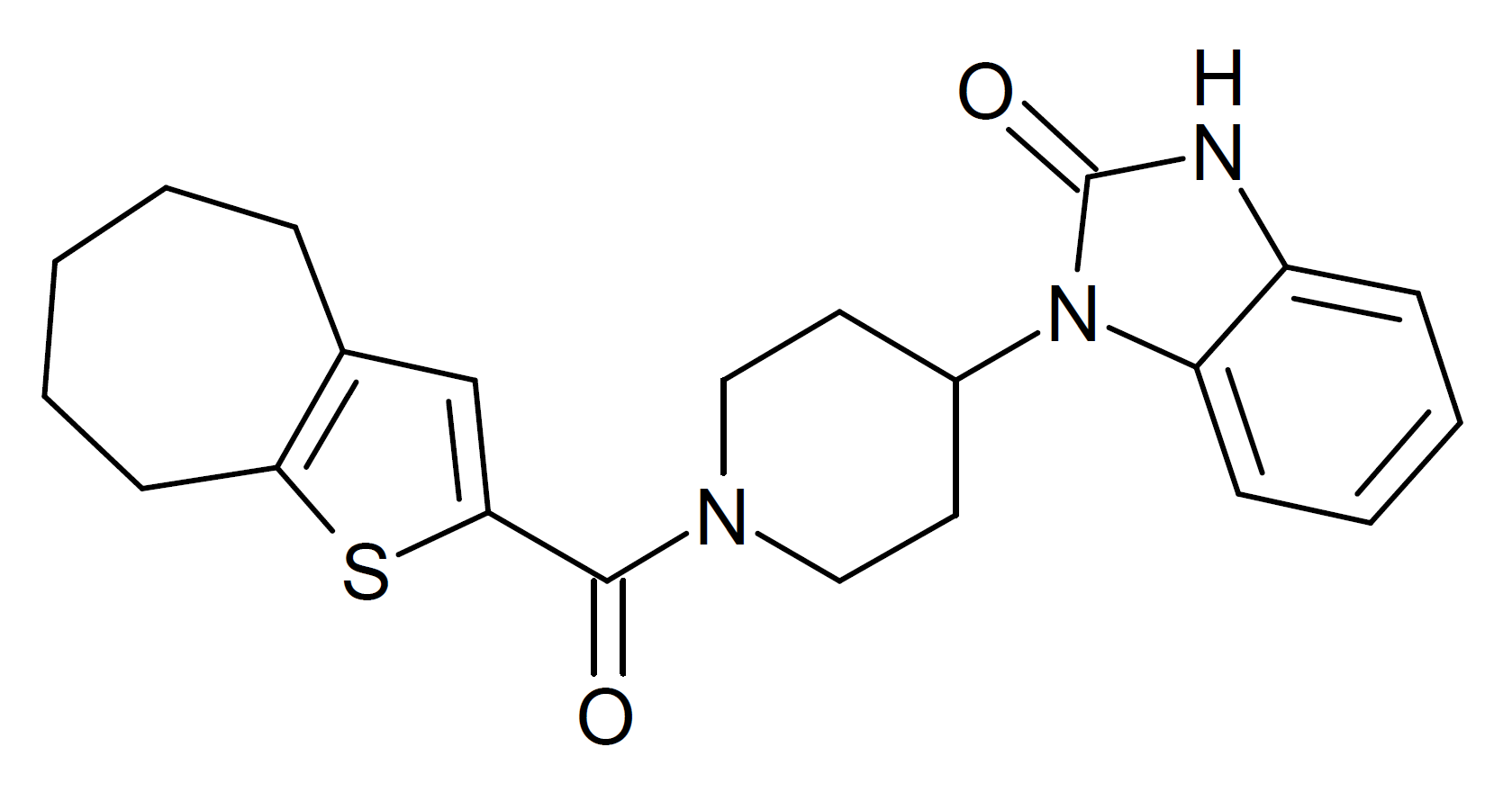

Identifiers
- IUPAC name: 3-[1-(5,6,7,8-tetrahydro-4H-cyclohepta[b]thiophene-2-carbonyl)piperidin-4-yl]-1H-benzimidazol-2-one
- CAS Number: 924377-85-5
- PubChem CID: 16376051
- ChemSpider: 10981314
- CompTox Dashboard (EPA): DTXSID701336582

Chemical and physical data
- Formula: C_{22}H_{25}N_{3}O_{2}S
- Molar mass: 395.52 g·mol^{−1}
- 3D model (JSmol): Interactive image
- SMILES: C1CCC2=C(CC1)SC(=C2)C(=O)N3CCC(CC3)N4C5=CC=CC=C5NC4=O
- InChI: InChI=1S/C22H25N3O2S/c26-21(20-14-15-6-2-1-3-9-19(15)28-20)24-12-10-16(11-13-24)25-18-8-5-4-7-17(18)23-22(25)27/h4-5,7-8,14,16H,1-3,6,9-13H2,(H,23,27); Key:AXWRAIIIBRLXBP-UHFFFAOYSA-N

GSK1702934A is a chemical compound which acts as an activator of the TRPC family of calcium channels, with selectivity for the TRPC3 and TRPC6 subtypes. It has been used to investigate the role of TRPC channels in heart function and regulation of blood pressure, as well as roles in the brain.
