= RNF24 =

Protein-coding gene in the species Homo sapiens

Identifiers
- Aliases: RNF24, G1L, ring finger protein 24
- External IDs: OMIM: 612489; MGI: 1261771; GeneCards: RNF24
Available structures
PDB	Ortholog search: PDBe RCSB
PDB	List of PDB id codes 2EP4

Gene location (Human)
Chr.	Chromosome 20 (human)
Band	20p13	Start	3,927,309 bp
Band	20p13	End	4,015,558 bp

Gene location (Mouse)
Chr.	Chromosome 2 (mouse)
Band	2 F1|2 63.32 cM	Start	131,139,984 bp
Band	2 F1|2 63.32 cM	End	131,194,812 bp
RNA expression pattern
Bgee	Human / Mouse (ortholog); Top expressed in: secondary oocyte; blood; pericardium; cartilage tissue; nipple; renal medulla; stromal cell of endometrium; trigeminal ganglion; endothelial cell; Descending thoracic aorta / Top expressed in: zygote; secondary oocyte; otolith organ; utricle; human kidney; seminiferous tubule; ganglionic eminence; hand; right kidney; proximal tubule; More reference expression data
BioGPS	n/a
Gene ontology
Molecular function	zinc ion binding; protein binding; ubiquitin protein ligase activity; metal ion binding
Cellular component	integral component of membrane; Golgi membrane; membrane; Golgi apparatus; endomembrane system
Biological process	protein polyubiquitination; proteasome-mediated ubiquitin-dependent protein catabolic process; protein ubiquitination
Sources:Amigo / QuickGO
Orthologs
Databases	NCBI: entry; OMA: entry
Species	Human	Mouse
Entrez	11237	51902
Ensembl	ENSG00000101236	ENSMUSG00000048911
UniProt	Q9Y225	Q8BGI1
RefSeq (mRNA)	NM_001134337; NM_001134338; NM_007219; NM_001321749; NM_016502	NM_178607
RefSeq (protein)	NP_001127809; NP_001127810; NP_001308678; NP_009150	NP_848722
Location (UCSC)	Chr 20: 3.93 – 4.02 Mb	Chr 2: 131.14 – 131.19 Mb
PubMed search
- Wikidata
View/Edit Human	View/Edit Mouse

Ring finger protein 24 is a protein that in humans is encoded by the RNF24 gene.

RNF24 binds TRPC6 (603652) and other transient receptor potential cation channel (TRPC) family members and is involved in regulation of intracellular trafficking of TRPCs. In addition, RNF24 contains similarity to the Drosophila goliath protein and thus may function as a transcription factor.
