= SPMIP10 =

Human gene and protein

Identifiers
- Aliases: SPMIP10, C5orf48, Tseg7, testis expressed 43, sperm microtubule inner protein 10, TEX43
- External IDs: MGI: 1914593; GeneCards: SPMIP10

Gene location (Human)
Chr.	Chromosome 5 (human)
Band	5q23.2	Start	126,631,705 bp
Band	5q23.2	End	126,636,284 bp

Gene location (Mouse)
Chr.	Chromosome 18 (mouse)
Band	18|18 D3	Start	56,721,422 bp
Band	18|18 D3	End	56,727,854 bp
RNA expression pattern
Bgee	Human / Mouse (ortholog); Top expressed in: testicle; sperm; left testis; right testis; rectum; buccal mucosa cell; mucosa of transverse colon; tibialis anterior muscle; cerebellar hemisphere; epithelium of colon / Top expressed in: seminiferous tubule; spermatid; lumbar subsegment of spinal cord; spermatocyte; embryo; embryo; intestinal villus; mucosa of small intestine; deep cerebellar nuclei; globus pallidus; More reference expression data
BioGPS	n/a
Orthologs
Databases	NCBI: entry; OMA: entry
Species	Human	Mouse
Entrez	389320	67343
Ensembl	ENSG00000196900	ENSMUSG00000032900
UniProt	Q6ZNM6	Q9D9I1
RefSeq (mRNA)	NM_207408	NM_026099
RefSeq (protein)	NP_997291	NP_080375
Location (UCSC)	Chr 5: 126.63 – 126.64 Mb	Chr 18: 56.72 – 56.73 Mb
PubMed search
- Wikidata
View/Edit Human	View/Edit Mouse

SPMIP10 is a protein that in humans is encoded by the SPMIP10 gene.

== Tissue distribution ==
=== Expression pattern ===
SPMIP10 mRNA expression data, obtained from NCBI Gene, shows that SPMIP10 is expressed in varying amounts in both fetal (highest between the 10th and 15th week of development) and adult human tissues. There is SPMIP10 expression seen in heart tissues (approximately 0.049 RPKM) and kidney tissues (approximately 0.064 RPKM) at week 10 and in intestine tissues at 15 weeks (approximately 0.016 RPKM) in fetal tissues. RNA sequencing (RNA-seq) of total SPMIP10 RNA from 20 human tissues showed expression levels at approximately 0.064 reads per kilobase, per million mapped reads (RPKM) in cerebellum tissue. Transcription profiling by high throughput sequencing of 16 human tissues indicated high tests expression (approximately 6.5 RPKM) and low expression levels in lymph node and thyroid tissues. RNA-seq of 95 human individuals showed the highest expression levels of SPMIP10 mRNA expression in the testis at approximately 4.6 RPKM with minute amounts seen in colon and small intestine tissue samples.

=== Microarray expression data ===
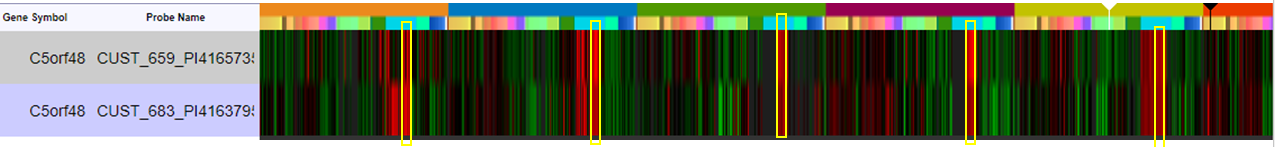
SPMIP10 Microarray Expression Schematic in the Human Brain. Yellow boxes indicate areas of dense expression in the posterior lobe. Data obtained from the Allen Brain Atlas website.

An experiment, from the Allen Brain Atlas site, indicated low amounts of SPMIP10 expression throughout various structures in the human brain (see SPMIP10 Microarray Expression Schematic in the Human Brain). Higher amounts of expression for SPMIP10 in the human brain were found in the posterior lobe, parietal lobe, and the amygdala. Higher amounts were primarily seen concentrated in the posterior lobe. Table 1 summarizes these findings.

Table 1: Human brain structures expressing higher amounts of SPMIP10
Structure	Location	Function	z-score
Lobule VIIIA	Posterior Lobe	Vasopressin and Oxytocin production	4.3958
Basomedial nucleus	Amygdala	Decision-making and adaptation of instinctive behaviors inn response to environmental stimuli	3.7596
Superior parietal lobule	Parietal lobe	Sensory perception and integration	3.114
Lobule VIIB	Posterior lobe	Vasopressin and Oxytocin production	3.0986
Lobule VIIIA	Posterior lobe	Vasopressin and Oxytocin production	3.0757
Lobule IX	Posterior lobe	Vasopressin and Oxytocin production	3.0531
Lobule VIIIA	Posterior lobe	Vasopressin and Oxytocin production	3.0018

== Gene ==
SPMIP10 (or Sperm Microtubule Inner Protein 10) is also known as Testis Expressed 43, C5orf48, Tseg7, Sperm Associated Microtubule Inner Protein 10, and Testis Specific Expressed Gene 73.

Ideogram of the SPMIP10 Gene Location on Chromosome 5. The gene location is indicated by the red line.

SPMIP10 is located on the plus strand of the long arm of chromosome 5, band 23, sub-band 2 (5q23.2, see the ideogram of the SPMIP10 gene location on chromosome 5).

SPMIP10 is a 478 bp long protein-coding gene. SPMIP10 contains three exons. Exon 1 spans from position 1–116, exon 2 spans from positions 117–225, and exon 3 spans from positions 226–478 in the SPMIP10 DNA sequence.

== Transcript ==
=== Known isoforms ===
There are no known isoforms for SPMIP10 in humans.

== Transcript level regulation ==
=== 5’ UTR ===
There is no 5’ UTR for SPMIP10 because its first exon begins at the start of translation.

3’ UTR

The 3' UTR sequence of SPMIP10 in humans is highly conserved in various mammals. It is predicted to contain 3 stem loops.

=== Translation initiation and enhancers ===
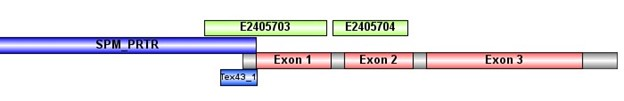
SPMIP10 Transcription Regulation Diagram. Two predicated enhancers (E2405703 and E2405704) and an initiation region (Tex43_1) are labeled.

Utilizing UCSC Genome Browser, a transcription initiation site (Tex43_1) for SPMIP10 was located at positions 126,631,722–126,631,782 on chromosome 5 along with two enhancers (E2405703 and E2405704). These findings are depicted in the SPMIP10 Transcription Regulation Diagram.

== Protein ==
=== Compositional analysis ===
SPMIP10 has a predicted molecular weight (Mw) of 15.5 kda and a theoretical isoelectric point (pI) of 9.3. Similar predicted molecular weights and theoretical isoelectric points are seen for various close orthologs (mammals, sequence identity >79%). Varying predicted molecular weights and theoretical isoelectric points are seen in distant orthologs (non-mammal vertebrates, sequence identity <79%).

SPMIP10 protein in humans, as well as various closely related organism, has higher levels than normal of histidine and lower than normal levels of alanine.

=== Domains ===
SPMIP10 contains a domain of unknown function, DUF4513, from positions 33-452.

=== Predicted tertiary structure ===
SPMIP10 has a tertiary structure that includes both beta sheets and alpha helices. These structures, predicted by AlphaFold and iTasser, are shown in the below images.

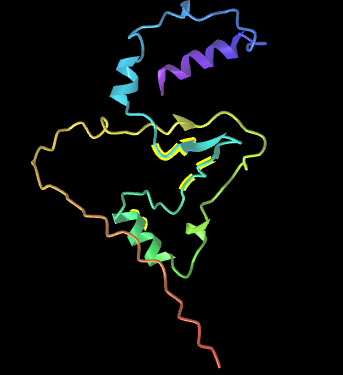
SPMIP10 predicted tertiary structure. Generated using AlphaFold.

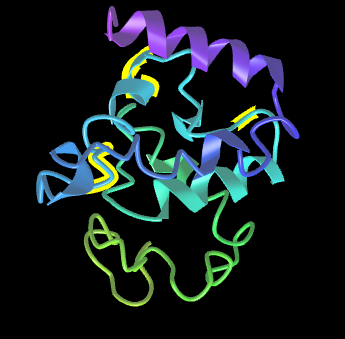
SPMIP10 predicted tertiary structure. Generated using iTasser.

== Protein level regulation ==
=== Subcellular localization ===
SPMIP10 protein is predicted to be localized in the nucleus and cytoplasm, primarily. DEEPLOC-2.0 indicates that SPMIP10 is located in the cytoplasm and contains a nuclear export signal at positions 130-134 of the protein.

=== Post-translational modifications ===
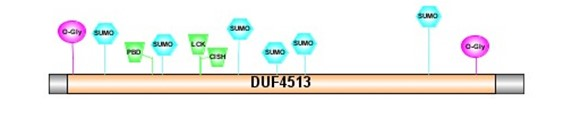
Annotated Conserved Post-translational Modifications for SPMIP10 Diagram. Longer ticks indicate higher confidence scores.

SPMIP10 has predicted SUMOylation sites (positions 107, 13, 65, 25, 54, 29, and 41), O-glycosylation sites (positions 10 and 122), and phosphoprotein-binding domains (SH2/LCK at position 30, SH2/CISH at position 30, and PBD at position 24). The locations of these modifications are labeled in the Annotated Conserved Post-translational Modifications for SPMIP10 Diagram.

== Homology and evolution ==
=== Paralogs ===
There are no known paralogs of SPMIP10 in humans.

=== Orthologs ===
The SPMIP10 protein is only found in vertebrates. Species containing the SPMIP10 protein include mammals (26.5-100% identity), reptiles (40.9-48.1% identity), birds (23.2-41.8% identity), amphibians (27.7-37.1% identity), and fish (27.9-35.5% identity). Table 2 contains twenty orthologs and their respective sequence identity in relation to SPMIP10 in humans.

Table 2: SPMIP10 orthologs organized by median date of divergence and sequence identity percentage
SPMIP10	Genus/Species	Common Name	Taxonomic Group	Est. Date of Divergence (MYA)	Accession Number	Sequence Length (aa)	Sequence Identity (%)	Sequence Similarity (%)
Mammals	Homo sapiens	Humans	Hominidae	0 MYA	NP_997291.1	134	100	100
	Lemur catta	Ring-tailed lemur	Primates	74 MYA	XP_045421967.1	134	91.8	94.8
	Callorhinus ursinus	Northern fur seal	Carnivora	94 MYA	XP_025716752.1	134	86.6	91.8
	Pteropus vampyrus	Large flying fox	Chiroptera	94 MYA	XP_011356632.1	134	79.1	87.3
	Phascolarctos cinereus	Koala	Diprotodontia	160 MYA	XP_020863037.1	133	58.2	70.2
	Tachyglossus aculeatus	Australian echidna	Monotremata	180 MYA	XP_038625455.1	236	26.5	34.6
Reptilia	Crocodylus porosus	Australian saltwater crocodile	Crocodylia	319 MYA	XP_019410982.1	116	48.1	64.4
	Gopherus evgoodei	Goodes thornscrub tortoise	Testudines	319 MYA	XP_030422994.1	116	46.3	59.0
	Lacerta agilis	Sand lizard	Squamata	319 MYA	XP_033019986.1	131	44.6	61.2
	Alligator mississippiensis	American alligator	Crocodylia	319 MYA	XP_059580882.1	132	40.9	52.6
Aves	Dromaius novaehollandiae	Emu	Casuariiformes	319 MYA	XP_025971178.1	108	41.8	56.7
	Antrostomus carolinensis	Chuck-wills-widow	Caprimulgiformes	319 MYA	XP_028940340.1	159	35.7	48.0
	Gavia stellata	Red-throated loon	Gaviiformes	319 MYA	XP_059690006.1	145	30.1	42.8
	Nipponia nippon	Crested ibis	Pelecaniformes	319 MYA	XP_009470769.1	90	25.0	35.1
	Buceros rhinoceros silvestris	Rhinoceros hornbill	Bucerotiformes	319 MYA	XP_010133851.1	138	23.2	39.3
Amphibian	Rana temporaria	Common frog	Anura	352 MYA	XP_040200566.1	155	37.1	54.7
	Bufo bufo	Common toad	Anura	352 MYA	XP_040276142.1	169	33.7	50.3
	Geotrypetes seraphini	Gaboon caecilian	Gymnophiona	352 MYA	XP_033815079.1	119	32.4	50.0
	Xenopus tropicalis	Tropical clawed frog	Anura	352 MYA	XP_002931758.1	174	27.7	42.4
Fish	Protopterus annectens	West African lungfish	Lepidosireniformes	408 MYA	XP_043916719.1	116	35.5	48.6
	Labrus bergylta	Labrus bergylta	Labriformes	429 MYA	XP_020509209.2	152	32.2	42.8
	Petromyzon marinus	Sea lamprey	Petromyzontiformes	563 MYA	XP_032809373.1	115	30.3	47.9
	Anabas testudineus	Climbing perch	Perciformes	429 MYA	XP_026199556.1	147	27.9	44.2

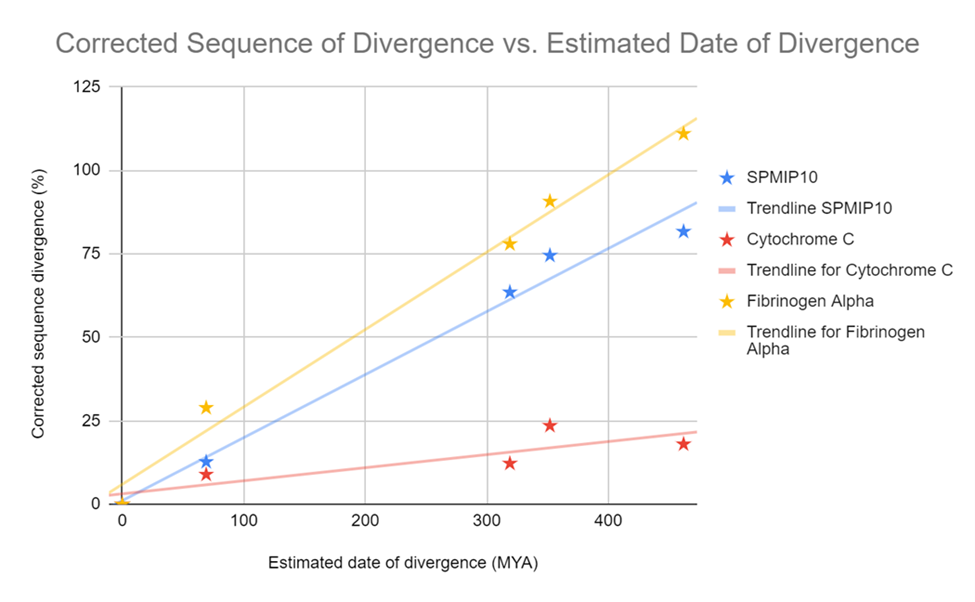
Graph 1: Corrected sequence divergence vs estimated date of divergence for SPMIP10, Cytochrome C and Fibrinogen Alpha.

=== Rate of divergence ===
Graph 1 shows the corrected sequence divergence vs estimated date of divergence for SPMIP10 compared to Cytochrome C and Fibrinogen Alpha. SPMIP10 evolves at a pace similar to that of Fibrinogen Alpha than.

== Function ==
On the B-tubule of the flagellum microtubule doublets, ENKUR protein interacts with the loop region of the SPMIP10 protein providing flagellum reinforcement in mammalian sperm. SPMIP10 binds closely to ENKUR and envelops itself around the inter-promoter interface of CCDC105, in this regard, SPMIP10 functions as a “staple” while interacting with protofilaments A12 and A11. SPMIP10 enveloping of CCDC105 provides the promoter with stabilization.

A 4bp deletion, resulting in a frameshift mutation (introducing a premature stop condone 33 aa further), of SPMIP10 in mice has been shown to slightly decrease sperm velocity and motility, however not lower rates of fertilization. Wild-type mouse sperm maintained flexibility at both the mid and end pieces of the flagellum, while the SPMIP10 knock-out mouse sperm showed reduced flexibility at the endpiece of the flagellum.

== Clinical significance ==
The duplication of SPMIP10 correlates with karyotypically balanced chromosomal rearrangements associates with decreased cognitive abilities as well as craniofacial and hand dysmorphisms.

The depletion of p63 in ME180 cells (human cervical adenocarcinoma epithelial cells) correlates with a decrease of SPMIP10 expression. Wild-type ME180 cells have slightly higher amounts of SMPIP10 expression on average than those that experienced a depletion of p63.

Diseased cells expressing low levels of EVI1 have higher mean expression of SPMIP10 than diseased cells expressing elevated levels.
