= Particulate pollution =

Pollution of an environment that consists of particles suspended in some medium

PM2.5 air pollution

Particulate pollution is pollution of an environment that consists of particles suspended in some medium. There are three primary forms: atmospheric particulate matter, marine debris, and space debris. Some particles are released directly from a specific source, while others form in chemical reactions in the atmosphere. Particulate pollution can be derived from either natural sources or anthropogenic processes.

== Atmospheric particulate matter ==
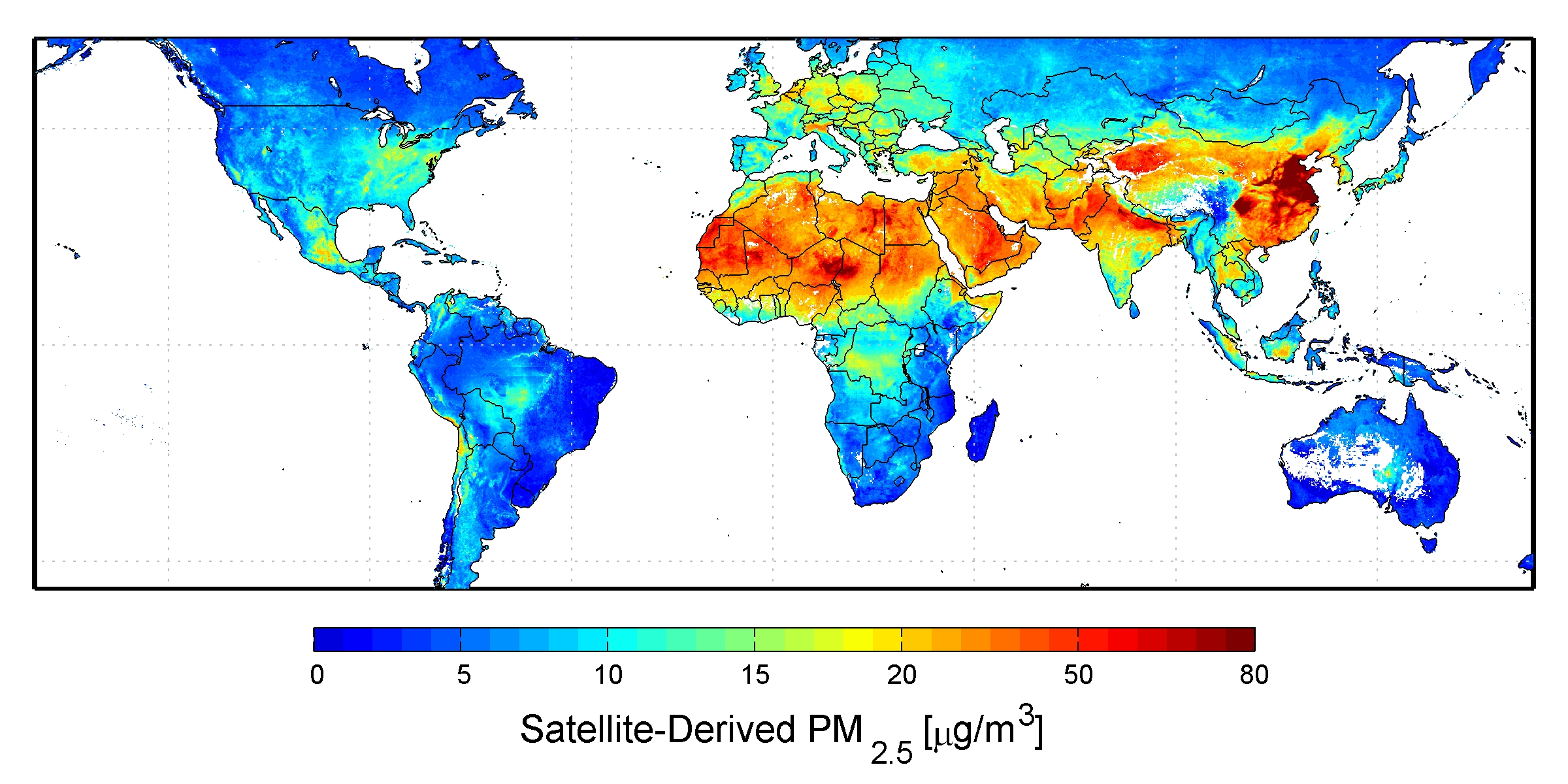
Average global distribution of particulate matter (PM2.5) concentrations (2001-2006)

Atmospheric particulate matter, also known as particulate matter, or PM, describes solids and/or liquid particles suspended in a gas, most commonly the Earth's atmosphere. Particles in the atmosphere can be divided into two types, depending on the way they are emitted. Primary particles, such as mineral dust, are emitted into the atmosphere. Secondary particles, such as ammonium nitrate, are formed in the atmosphere through gas-to-particle conversion.

=== Sources ===
Some particulates occur naturally, originating from volcanoes, dust storms, forest and grassland fires, living vegetation and sea spray. Human activities, such as the burning of fossil fuels in vehicles, wood burning, stubble burning, power plants, road dust, wet cooling towers in cooling systems and various industrial processes, also generate significant amounts of particulates. Coal combustion in developing countries is the primary method for heating homes and supplying energy. Because salt spray over the oceans is the overwhelmingly most common form of particulate in the atmosphere, anthropogenic aerosols—those made by human activities—currently account for about 10 percent of the total mass of aerosols in our atmosphere.

Microplastics are an emerging source of atmospheric pollution, particularly fine plastic fibers that are light enough to be carried by the wind. Microplastics traveling in the air cannot be traced back to their specific original sources, as the wind can blow the infinitesimal particles thousands of miles from where they were originally shed. Microplastics are being found in very remote regions of the Earth, where there are no apparent nearby sources of plastic. A common source of airborne microplastic fibers is plastic textiles. While most atmospheric microplastics tend to come from land, microplastics are also entering the atmosphere through ocean and sea mist.

==== Domestic combustion and wood smoke ====
Domestic combustion pollution is mainly composed of burning fuel including wood, gas, and charcoal in activities of heating, cooking, agriculture, and wildfires. Major domestic pollutants contain 17% of carbon dioxide, 13% of carbon monoxide, 6% of nitrogen monoxide, polycyclic aromatic hydrocarbons, and fine and ultrafine particles.

In the United Kingdom domestic combustion is the largest single source of PM2.5 annually. In some towns and cities in New South Wales wood smoke may be responsible for 60% of fine particle air pollution in the winter. Research conducted about biomass burning in 2015, estimated that 38% of European total particulate pollution emissions are composed of domestic wood burning.

The particulate pollutant is often in microscopic size that enables it to infiltrate into interior space even if windows and doors are closed. The main component of woodsmoke, black carbon significantly appears in the indoor environment compared to other ambient pollutants. If the room is sealed tight enough to prevent woodsmoke transmission, it will also prevent oxygen exchange from indoors to outdoor. The regular dust mask also can help little with particulate pollutants since they are designed to filter out larger particles. A mask with HEPA filter can filter out microscopic pollutants but cause difficulty of breathing to the population with lung disease.

Living under high concentrations of pollutants can lead to headaches, fatigue, lung disease, asthma, and throat and eye irritation. One of the most common diseases among those living among pollutants is chronic obstructive pulmonary disease (COPD). Exposure to wood and charcoal smoke is significantly associated with COPD diagnoses among those living in developing and developed countries. Exposure to woodsmoke intensifies the respiratory systems and increases the risk of hospital admissions.

== Marine debris ==
Marine debris and marine aerosols refer to particulates suspended in a liquid, usually water on the Earth's surface. Particulates in water are a kind of water pollution measured as total suspended solids, a water quality measurement listed as a conventional pollutant in the U.S. Clean Water Act, a water quality law. Notably, some of the same kinds of particles can be suspended both in air and water, and pollutants specifically may be carried in the air and deposited in water, or fall to the ground as acid rain. The majority of marine aerosols are created through the bubble bursting of breaking waves and capillary action on the ocean surface due to the stress exerted from surface winds. Among common marine aerosols, pure sea salt aerosols are the major component of marine aerosols with an annual global emission between 2,000-10,000 teragrams annually. Through interactions with water, many marine aerosols help to scatter light, and aid in cloud condensation and ice nuclei (IN); thus, affecting the atmospheric radiation budget. When they interact with anthropogenic pollution, marine aerosols can affect biogeochemical cycles through the depletion of acids such as nitric acid and halogens.

== Space debris ==
Space debris describes particulates in the vacuum of outer space, specifically particles originating from human activity that remain in geocentric orbit around the Earth. The International Association of Astronauts define space debris as "any man-made Earth orbiting object which is non-functional with no reasonable expectation of assuming or resuming its intended function or any other function for which it is or can be expected to be authorized, including fragments and parts thereof".

Space debris is classified by size and operational purpose, and divided into four main subsets: inactive payloads, operational debris, fragmentation debris and microparticulate matter. Inactive payloads refer to any launched space objects that have lost the capability to reconnect to its corresponding space operator; thus, preventing a return to Earth. In contrast, operational debris describes the matter associated with the propulsion of a larger entity into space, which may include upper rocket stages and ejected nose cones. Fragmentation debris refers to any object in space that has become dissociated from a larger entity by means of explosion, collision or deterioration. Microparticulate matter describes space matter that typically cannot be seen singly with the naked eye, including particles, gases, and spaceglow.

In response to research that concluded that impacts from Earth orbital debris could lead to greater hazards to spacecraft than the natural meteoroid environment, NASA began the orbital debris program in 1979, initiated by the Space Sciences branch at Johnson Space Center (JSC). Beginning with an initial budget of $70,000, the NASA orbital debris program began with the initial goals of characterizing hazards induced by space debris and creating mitigation standards that would minimize the growth of the orbital debris environment. By 1990, the NASA orbital debris program created a debris monitoring program, which included mechanisms to sample the low Earth orbit (LEO) environment for debris as small as 6mm using the Haystack X-band ground radar.

== Epidemiology ==
Particulate pollution is observed around the globe in varying sizes and compositions and is the focus of many epidemiological studies. Particulate matter (PM) is generally classified into two main size categories: PM_{10} and PM_{2.5}. PM_{10}, also known as coarse particulate matter, consists of particles 10 micrometers (μm) and smaller, while PM_{2.5}, also called fine particulate matter, consists of particles 2.5 μm and smaller. Particles 2.5 μm or smaller in size are especially notable as they can be inhaled into the lower respiratory system, and with enough exposure, absorbed into the bloodstream. Particulate pollution can occur directly or indirectly from a number of sources including, but not limited to: agriculture, automobiles, construction, forest fires, chemical pollutants, and power plants.

Exposure to particulates of any size and composition may occur acutely over a short duration, or chronically over a long duration. Particulate exposure has been associated with adverse respiratory symptoms ranging from irritation of the airways, aggravated asthma, coughing, and difficulty breathing from acute exposure to symptoms such as irregular heartbeat, lung cancer, kidney disease, chronic bronchitis, and premature death in individuals who suffer from pre-existing cardiovascular or lung diseases due to chronic exposure. The severity of health effects generally depends upon the size of the particles as well as the health status of the individual exposed; older adults, children, pregnant women, and immunocompromised populations are at the greatest risk for adverse health outcomes. Short-term exposure to particulate pollution has been linked to adverse health impacts.

As a result, the US Environmental Protection Agency (EPA) and various health agencies around the world have established thresholds for concentrations of PM_{2.5} and PM_{10} that are determined to be acceptable. However, there is no known safe level of exposure and thus, any exposure to particulate pollution is likely to increase an individual's risk of adverse health effects. In European countries, air quality at or above 10 micrograms per cubic meter of air (μg/m^{3}) for PM_{2.5} increases the all-causes daily mortality rate by 0.2-0.6% and the cardiopulmonary mortality rate by 6-13%.

Worldwide, PM_{10} concentrations of 70 μg/m^{3} and PM_{2.5} concentrations of 35 μg/m^{3} have been shown to increase long-term mortality by 15%. More so, approximately 4.2 million of all premature deaths observed in 2016 occurred due to airborne particulate pollution, 91% of which occurred in countries with low to middle socioeconomic status. Of these premature deaths, 58% were attributed to strokes and ischaemic heart diseases, 8% attributed to COPD (Chronic Obstructive Pulmonary Disease), and 6% to lung cancer.

In 2006, the EPA conducted air quality designations in all 50 states, denoting areas of high pollution based on criteria such as air quality monitoring data, recommendations submitted by the states, and other technical information; and reduced the National Ambient Air Quality Standard for daily exposure to particulates in the 2.5 micrometers and smaller category from 15 μg/m^{3} to 12 μg/m^{3} in 2012. As a result, U.S. annual PM_{2.5} averages have decreased from 13.5 μg/m^{3} to 8.02 μg/m^{3}, between 2000 and 2017.

Microplastics prove to be particularly concerning as particulate matter for their reactivity and ability to become contaminated. Microplastic particles, depending on their composition, can form carbonyl bonds on the surface, causing contaminants such as heavy metals to be adsorbed by the particle. When microplastic particles are inhaled, they persist in the lungs and cause inflammation. More research is needed to understand the long-term health effects of microplastics in the human body.

== Environmental Risks ==
Particulate matter (PM), particularly PM2.5, was found to be harmful to aquatic invertebrates. These aquatic invertebrates include fish, crustaceans, and Mollusca. In a study by Han et al, the effects of PM<2.5 micrometers on life history traits and oxidative stress were observed in Tigriopus japonicus. Exposure to particulate matter of less than 2.5 micrometers in diameter led to significant changes in ROS levels, indicating that particulate matter exposure was a causative agent of oxidative stress in Tigriopus japonicus. In addition to aquatic invertebrates, negative effects of particulate matter have been noted in mammals as well. Following acute exposure to ambient particulate matter, rats showed a significant increase in neutrophils and a significant decrease in lymphocytes, indicating that particulate matter exposure can result in activation of the sympathetic stress response.
