= Enkurin =

Protein-coding gene in the species Homo sapiens

ENKUR

Identifiers
- Aliases: ENKUR, C10orf63, CFAP106, enkurin, TRPC channel interacting protein
- External IDs: OMIM: 611025; MGI: 1918483; GeneCards: ENKUR

Gene location (Mouse)
Chr.	Chromosome 2 (mouse)
Band	2|2 A3	Start	21,185,542 bp
Band	2|2 A3	End	21,210,176 bp
RNA expression pattern
Bgee	Human / Mouse (ortholog); Top expressed in: bronchial epithelial cell; right uterine tube; monocyte; bone marrow cell; hypothalamus; caudate nucleus; ganglionic eminence; putamen; nucleus accumbens; amygdala / Top expressed in: seminiferous tubule; olfactory epithelium; otolith organ; utricle; spermatid; vestibular sensory epithelium; spermatocyte; right lung lobe; median eminence; Epithelium of choroid plexus; More reference expression data
BioGPS	n/a
Orthologs
Databases	NCBI: entry
Species	Human	Mouse
Entrez	219670	71233
Ensembl	n/a	ENSMUSG00000026679
UniProt	Q8TC29	Q6SP97
RefSeq (mRNA)	NM_001270383; NM_145010	NM_027728
RefSeq (protein)	NP_001257312; NP_659447	NP_082004
Location (UCSC)	n/a	Chr 2: 21.19 – 21.21 Mb
PubMed search
- Wikidata
View/Edit Human	View/Edit Mouse

Enkurin is a protein that in humans is encoded by the ENKUR gene.

Enkurin interacts with transient receptor potential canonical (TRPC) cation channels (e.g., TRPC1) and functions as an adaptor protein, tethering signal transduction proteins to TRPC channels.
