= STMN3 =

Protein-coding gene in the species Homo sapiens

Identifiers
- Aliases: STMN3, SCLIP, stathmin 3
- External IDs: OMIM: 608362; MGI: 1277137; GeneCards: STMN3

Gene location (Mouse)
Chr.	Chromosome 2 (mouse)
Band	2|2 H4	Start	180,948,252 bp
Band	2|2 H4	End	180,956,293 bp
RNA expression pattern
Bgee	Human / Mouse (ortholog); Top expressed in: pons; middle temporal gyrus; Brodmann area 23; endothelial cell; superior vestibular nucleus; nucleus accumbens; entorhinal cortex; parietal lobe; cerebellar vermis; postcentral gyrus / Top expressed in: facial motor nucleus; motor neuron; barrel cortex; superior cervical ganglion; pontine nuclei; anterior horn of spinal cord; medial vestibular nucleus; dorsal tegmental nucleus; prefrontal cortex; subiculum; More reference expression data
BioGPS	n/a
Gene ontology
Molecular function	protein domain specific binding; tubulin binding
Cellular component	growth cone; axon; neuron projection; Golgi apparatus; cell projection; cytoplasm; cytosol
Biological process	microtubule depolymerization; nervous system development; regulation of microtubule polymerization or depolymerization; regulation of GTPase activity; cytoplasmic microtubule organization; neuron projection development; regulation of cytoskeleton organization; negative regulation of Rac protein signal transduction; blastocyst hatching
Sources:Amigo / QuickGO
Orthologs
Databases	NCBI: entry
Species	Human	Mouse
Entrez	50861	20262
Ensembl	n/a	ENSMUSG00000027581
UniProt	Q9NZ72	O70166
RefSeq (mRNA)	NM_001276310; NM_015894	NM_009133
RefSeq (protein)	NP_001263239; NP_056978	NP_033159
Location (UCSC)	n/a	Chr 2: 180.95 – 180.96 Mb
PubMed search
- Wikidata
View/Edit Human	View/Edit Mouse

Stathmin-3 is a protein that in humans is encoded by the STMN3 gene.

== Function ==
The protein encoded by this gene belongs to the stathmin/oncoprotein 18 family of microtubule-destabilizing phosphoproteins. It is similar to the SCG10 protein and is involved in signal transduction and regulation of microtubule dynamics.

== Interactions ==
STMN3 has been shown to interact with TRPC5.
