= Transient receptor potential channel-interacting protein database =

Biological database

TRIP

Content
- Description: database of protein–protein interactions for mammalian TRP channels.

Contact
- Research center: Seoul National University College of Medicine
- Laboratory: Department of Physiology
- Authors: Young-Cheul Shin
- Primary citation: Shin & al. (2011)
- Release date: 2010

Access
- Website: http://www.trpchannel.org

Transient receptor potential channel-interacting protein database (TRIP) is a database of protein–protein interactions for the mammalian TRP channels.

== See also ==
- Protein-protein interactions
- TRP channels
