= BOSC23 =

Human cell line

BOSC 23 is a human kidney cell line developed by Warren Pear in David Baltimore's lab that was derived from the 293T cell line. The main use of BOSC 23 is the production of recombinant retroviruses; it stably expresses Moloney murine leukemia virus proteins and when transiently transfected with recombinant retroviral vector DNA, produces high titers of infectious retroviral particles. The cell line does not produce detectable replication-competent virus, an important safety feature.

BOSC 23 carries neomycin/G418 resistance derived from its parental line 293T, and also hygromycin and mycophenolic acid (gpt) resistance. It should be maintained under gpt selection.

This cell line is a model for cancer research, with emphasis on the lack of activated Src protein.
