= TRPC2 =

Pseudogene in the species Homo sapiens

Identifiers
- Aliases: TRPC2, transient receptor potential cation channel subfamily C member 2, pseudogene, transient receptor potential cation channel subfamily C member 2 (pseudogene)
- External IDs: GeneCards: TRPC2

Gene location (Human)
Chr.	Chromosome 11 (human)
Band	11p15.4	Start	3,616,679 bp
Band	11p15.4	End	3,637,672 bp
Orthologs
Databases	NCBI: entry; OMA: entry
Species	Human	Mouse
Entrez	7221	n/a
Ensembl	ENSG00000182048	n/a
UniProt	n a	n/a
RefSeq (mRNA)	n/a	n/a
RefSeq (protein)	n/a	n/a
Location (UCSC)	Chr 11: 3.62 – 3.64 Mb	n/a
PubMed search		n/a
- Wikidata
View/Edit Human

Transient receptor potential cation channel, subfamily C, member 2, also known as TRPC2, is a protein that in humans is encoded by the TRPC2 pseudogene. This protein is not expressed in humans but is in certain other species such as mouse.

== Interactions ==
TRPC2 has been shown to interact with TRPC6.

== See also ==
- TRPC
