= TRPC4 =

Protein and coding gene in humans

Identifiers
- Aliases: TRPC4, HTRP-4, HTRP4, TRP4, transient receptor potential cation channel subfamily C member 4
- External IDs: OMIM: 603651; MGI: 109525; GeneCards: TRPC4

Gene location (Human)
Chr.	Chromosome 13 (human)
Band	13q13.3	Start	37,632,063 bp
Band	13q13.3	End	37,869,802 bp

Gene location (Mouse)
Chr.	Chromosome 3 (mouse)
Band	3 C|3 25.43 cM	Start	54,063,456 bp
Band	3 C|3 25.43 cM	End	54,225,892 bp
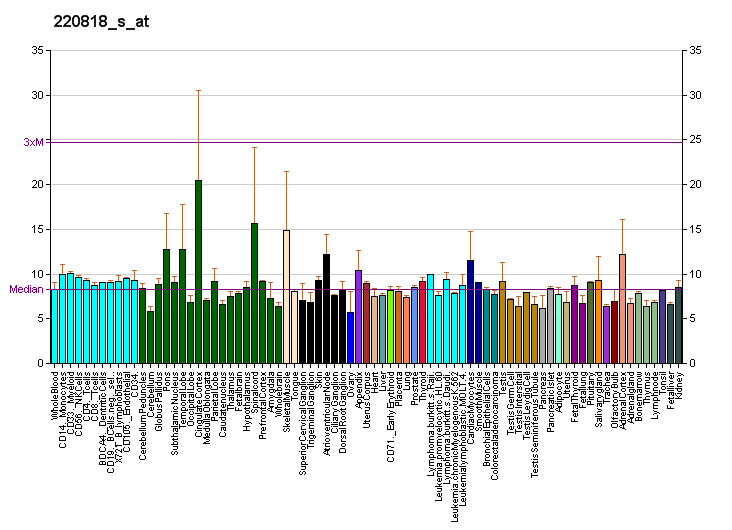

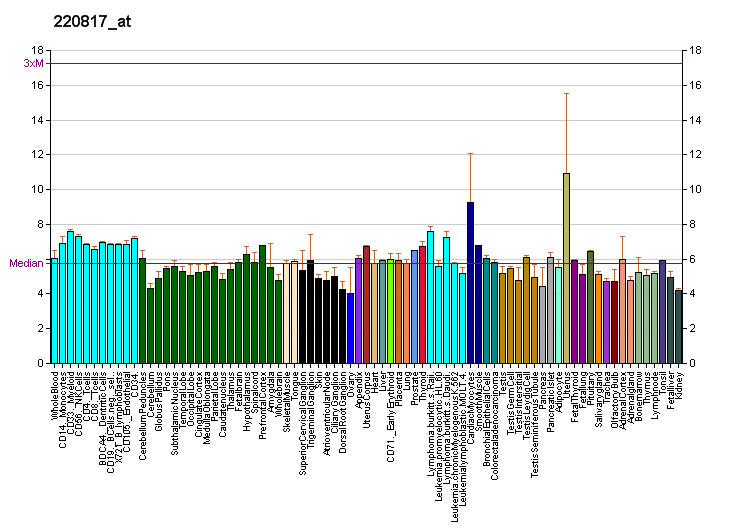
RNA expression pattern
Bgee	Human / Mouse (ortholog); Top expressed in: stromal cell of endometrium; decidua; smooth muscle tissue; testicle; body of uterus; right coronary artery; myometrium; left coronary artery; prostate; gallbladder / Top expressed in: lateral septal nucleus; subiculum; Region I of hippocampus proper; CA3 field; dentate gyrus; anterior amygdaloid area; hippocampus proper; dentate gyrus of hippocampal formation granule cell; barrel cortex; secondary oocyte; More reference expression data
BioGPS	More reference expression data
Gene ontology
Molecular function	beta-catenin binding; store-operated calcium channel activity; cadherin binding; inositol 1,4,5 trisphosphate binding; ion channel activity; protein binding; calcium channel activity
Cellular component	integral component of membrane; calcium channel complex; membrane; cell-cell junction; cortical cytoskeleton; plasma membrane; cell surface; basolateral plasma membrane; caveola; membrane raft; integral component of plasma membrane; protein-containing complex; cation channel complex
Biological process	regulation of cytosolic calcium ion concentration; calcium ion import; oligodendrocyte differentiation; ion transport; calcium ion transmembrane transport; manganese ion transport; gamma-aminobutyric acid secretion; calcium ion transport; transmembrane transport
Sources:Amigo / QuickGO
Orthologs
Databases	NCBI: entry; OMA: entry
Species	Human	Mouse
Entrez	7223	22066
Ensembl	ENSG00000133107	ENSMUSG00000027748
UniProt	Q9UBN4	Q9QUQ5
RefSeq (mRNA)	NM_001135955; NM_001135956; NM_001135957; NM_001135958; NM_003306 NM_016179; NM_001354799; NM_001354806; NM_001372055	NM_001253682; NM_001253683; NM_016984
RefSeq (protein)	NP_001129427; NP_001129428; NP_001129429; NP_001129430; NP_003297 NP_057263; NP_001341728; NP_001341735; NP_001358984	NP_001240611; NP_001240612; NP_058680
Location (UCSC)	Chr 13: 37.63 – 37.87 Mb	Chr 3: 54.06 – 54.23 Mb
PubMed search
- Wikidata
View/Edit Human	View/Edit Mouse

The short transient receptor potential channel 4 (TrpC4), also known as Trp-related protein 4, is a protein that in humans is encoded by the TRPC4 gene.

== Function ==
TrpC4 is a member of the transient receptor potential cation channels. This protein forms a non-selective calcium-permeable cation channel that is activated by Gαi-coupled receptors, Gαq-coupled receptors and tyrosine kinases, and plays a role in multiple processes including endothelial permeability, vasodilation, neurotransmitter release and cell proliferation.

== Tissue distribution ==
The nonselective cation channel TrpC4 has been shown to be present in high abundance in the cortico-limbic regions of the brain. In addition, TRPC4 mRNA is present in midbrain dopaminergic neurons in the ventral tegmental area and the substantia nigra.

== Roles ==
Deletion of the trpc4 gene decreases levels of sociability in a social exploration task. These results suggest that TRPC4 may play a role in regulating social anxiety in a number of different disorders. However deletion of the trpc4 gene had no impact on basic or complex strategic learning. Given that the trpc4 gene is expressed in a select population of midbrain dopamine neurons, it has been proposed that it may have an important role in dopamine related processes including addiction and attention.

== Clinical significance ==
Single nucleotide polymorphisms in this gene may be associated with generalized epilepsy with photosensitivity.

== Interactions ==
TRPC4 has been shown to interact with ITPR1, TRPC1, and TRPC5.

== See also ==
- TRPC
