= SESTD1 =

Protein-coding gene in the species Homo sapiens

Identifiers
- Aliases: SESTD1, SOLO, SEC14 and spectrin domain containing 1
- External IDs: MGI: 1916262; GeneCards: SESTD1

Gene location (Human)
Chr.	Chromosome 2 (human)
Band	2q31.2	Start	179,101,678 bp
Band	2q31.2	End	179,264,832 bp

Gene location (Mouse)
Chr.	Chromosome 2 (mouse)
Band	2|2 C3	Start	77,010,684 bp
Band	2|2 C3	End	77,110,936 bp
RNA expression pattern
Bgee	Human / Mouse (ortholog); Top expressed in: Achilles tendon; corpus callosum; lateral nuclear group of thalamus; gastric mucosa; inferior ganglion of vagus nerve; subthalamic nucleus; cartilage tissue; secondary oocyte; nasal epithelium; gonad / Top expressed in: otolith organ; utricle; trigeminal ganglion; hand; medial dorsal nucleus; Paneth cell; lobe of cerebellum; lateral geniculate nucleus; medial geniculate nucleus; spinal ganglia; More reference expression data
BioGPS	n/a
Gene ontology
Molecular function	phosphatidic acid binding; phosphatidylinositol-4-phosphate binding; phosphatidylinositol-5-phosphate binding; phosphatidylinositol-4,5-bisphosphate binding; 1-phosphatidylinositol binding; protein binding; phosphatidylserine binding; phosphatidylinositol-3-phosphate binding; phosphatidylinositol-3,5-bisphosphate binding; phosphatidylcholine binding; phosphatidylinositol-3,4-bisphosphate binding
Cellular component	calcium channel complex; intermediate filament cytoskeleton
Biological process	negative regulation of calcium ion transmembrane transport via high voltage-gated calcium channel
Sources:Amigo / QuickGO
Orthologs
Databases	NCBI: entry; OMA: entry
Species	Human	Mouse
Entrez	91404	228071
Ensembl	ENSG00000187231	ENSMUSG00000042272
UniProt	Q86VW0	Q80UK0
RefSeq (mRNA)	NM_178123	NM_175465
RefSeq (protein)	NP_835224	NP_780674
Location (UCSC)	Chr 2: 179.1 – 179.26 Mb	Chr 2: 77.01 – 77.11 Mb
PubMed search
- Wikidata
View/Edit Human	View/Edit Mouse

SEC14 and spectrin domains 1, also known as SEC14 domain and spectrin repeat-containing protein 1 and Solo, is a protein that in humans is encoded by the SESTD1 gene.
