= TRPC7 =

Protein-coding gene in the species Homo sapiens

Identifiers
- Aliases: TRPC7, TRP7, transient receptor potential cation channel subfamily C member 7
- External IDs: MGI: 1349470; GeneCards: TRPC7

Gene location (Human)
Chr.	Chromosome 5 (human)
Band	5q31.1	Start	136,212,745 bp
Band	5q31.1	End	136,365,545 bp

Gene location (Mouse)
Chr.	Chromosome 13 (mouse)
Band	13|13 B1	Start	56,920,926 bp
Band	13|13 B1	End	57,043,806 bp
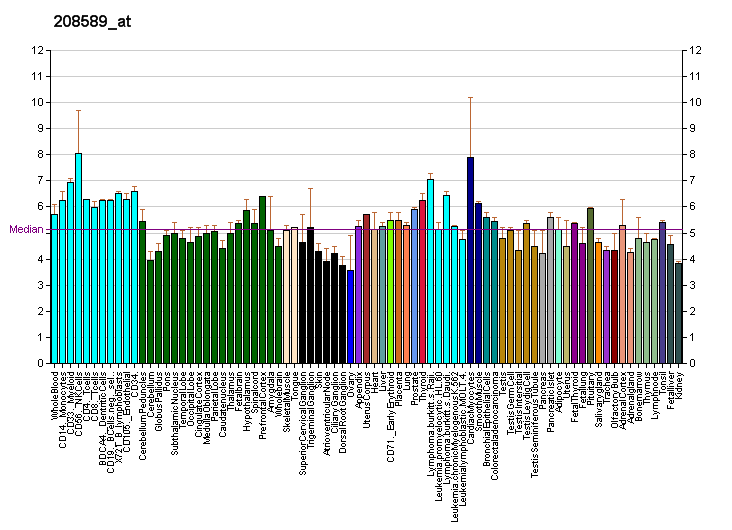
RNA expression pattern
Bgee	Human / Mouse (ortholog); Top expressed in: buccal mucosa cell; testicle; secondary oocyte; gonad; human kidney; rectum; duodenum; right testis; anterior pituitary; hypothalamus / Top expressed in: lateral septal nucleus; anterior amygdaloid area; ventromedial nucleus; intestinal villus; paraventricular nucleus of hypothalamus; globus pallidus; deep cerebellar nuclei; olfactory tubercle; lateral hypothalamus; medial dorsal nucleus; More reference expression data
BioGPS	More reference expression data
Gene ontology
Molecular function	store-operated calcium channel activity; ion channel activity; protein binding; calcium channel activity; inositol 1,4,5 trisphosphate binding
Cellular component	integral component of membrane; nuclear envelope; membrane; cis-Golgi network; plasma membrane; integral component of plasma membrane; perinuclear region of cytoplasm; nucleus; cation channel complex
Biological process	regulation of cytosolic calcium ion concentration; ion transport; single fertilization; platelet activation; calcium ion transmembrane transport; manganese ion transport; calcium ion transport; transmembrane transport
Sources:Amigo / QuickGO
Orthologs
Databases	NCBI: entry; OMA: entry
Species	Human	Mouse
Entrez	57113	26946
Ensembl	ENSG00000069018	ENSMUSG00000021541
UniProt	Q9HCX4	Q9WVC5
RefSeq (mRNA)	NM_001167576; NM_001167577; NM_020389; NM_001376901	NM_012035; NM_001302372; NM_001302373
RefSeq (protein)	NP_001161048; NP_001161049; NP_065122; NP_001363830	NP_001289301; NP_001289302; NP_036165
Location (UCSC)	Chr 5: 136.21 – 136.37 Mb	Chr 13: 56.92 – 57.04 Mb
PubMed search
- Wikidata
View/Edit Human	View/Edit Mouse

Transient receptor potential cation channel, subfamily C, member 7, also known as TRPC7, is a human gene encoding a protein of the same name.

== See also ==
- TRPC
