= TRPC1 =

Protein and coding gene in humans

Identifiers
- Aliases: TRPC1, HTRP-1, TRP1, transient receptor potential cation channel subfamily C member 1
- External IDs: OMIM: 602343; MGI: 109528; GeneCards: TRPC1

Gene location (Human)
Chr.	Chromosome 3 (human)
Band	3q23	Start	142,724,034 bp
Band	3q23	End	142,807,888 bp

Gene location (Mouse)
Chr.	Chromosome 9 (mouse)
Band	9 E3.3|9 50.2 cM	Start	95,587,135 bp
Band	9 E3.3|9 50.2 cM	End	95,632,428 bp
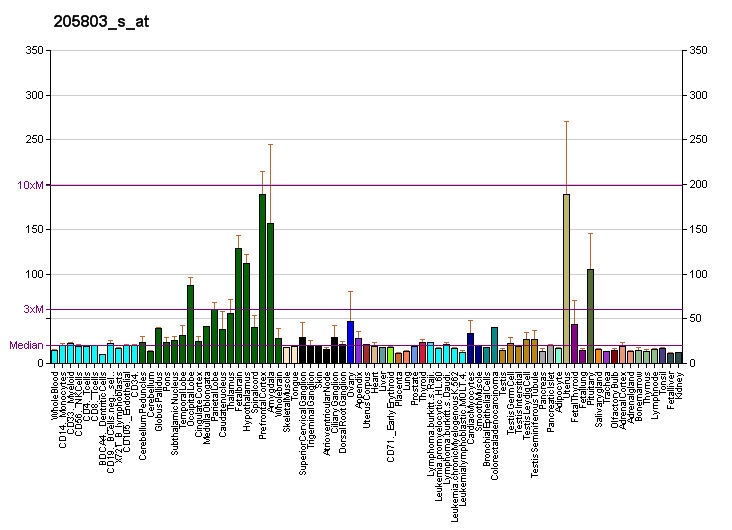

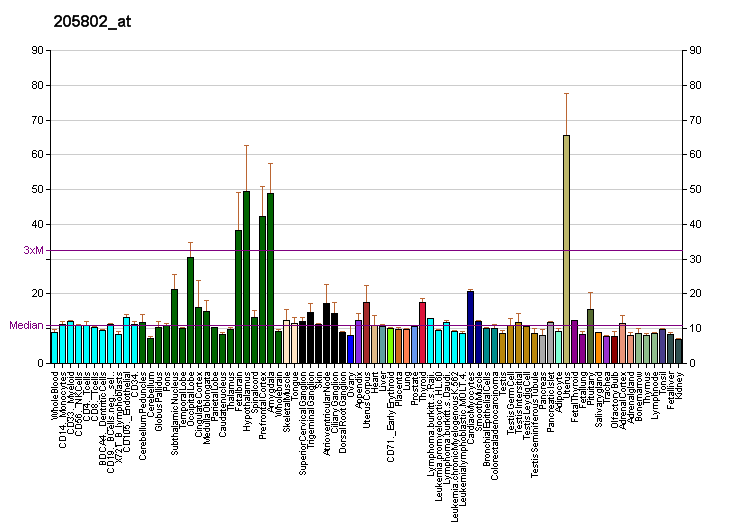

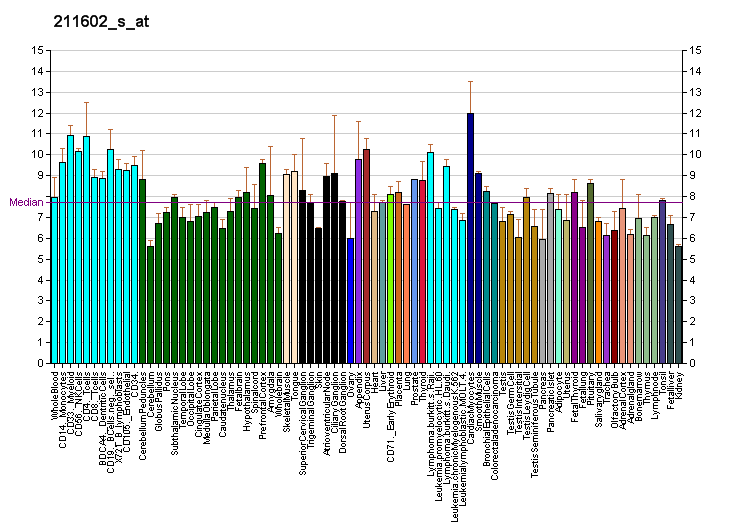
RNA expression pattern
Bgee	Human / Mouse (ortholog); Top expressed in: germinal epithelium; buccal mucosa cell; Achilles tendon; tibia; Brodmann area 23; Epithelium of choroid plexus; endothelial cell; middle temporal gyrus; parietal pleura; corpus callosum / Top expressed in: retinal pigment epithelium; dorsal striatum; barrel cortex; olfactory tubercle; neural layer of retina; epithelium of lens; lateral septal nucleus; medial dorsal nucleus; lobe of cerebellum; subiculum; More reference expression data
BioGPS	More reference expression data
Gene ontology
Molecular function	store-operated calcium channel activity; transmembrane transporter binding; calcium channel activity; inositol 1,4,5 trisphosphate binding; ion channel activity; protein binding; cation channel activity
Cellular component	integral component of membrane; membrane; receptor complex; plasma membrane; integral component of plasma membrane; cation channel complex
Biological process	melanin biosynthetic process; regulation of cardiac conduction; regulation of cytosolic calcium ion concentration; positive regulation of release of sequestered calcium ion into cytosol; ion transport; response to calcium ion; calcium ion transmembrane transport; manganese ion transport; calcium ion transport; transmembrane transport
Sources:Amigo / QuickGO
Orthologs
Databases	NCBI: entry; OMA: entry
Species	Human	Mouse
Entrez	7220	22063
Ensembl	ENSG00000144935	ENSMUSG00000032839
UniProt	P48995	Q61056
RefSeq (mRNA)	NM_001251845; NM_003304	NM_011643; NM_001311123
RefSeq (protein)	NP_001238774; NP_003295	NP_001298052; NP_035773
Location (UCSC)	Chr 3: 142.72 – 142.81 Mb	Chr 9: 95.59 – 95.63 Mb
PubMed search
- Wikidata
View/Edit Human	View/Edit Mouse

Transient receptor potential canonical 1 (TRPC1) is a protein that in humans is encoded by the TRPC1 gene.

== Function ==
TRPC1 is an ion channel located on the plasma membrane of numerous human and animal cell types. It is a nonspecific cation channel, which means that both sodium and calcium ions can pass through it. TRPC1 is thought to mediate calcium entry in response to depletion of endoplasmic calcium stores or activation of receptors coupled to the phospholipase C system. In HEK293 cells the unitary current-voltage relationship of endogenous TRPC1 channels is almost linear, with a slope conductance of about 17 pS. The extrapolated reversal potential of TRPC1 channels is +30 mV. The TRPC1 protein is widely expressed throughout the mammalian brain and has a similar corticolimbic expression pattern as TRPC4 and TRPC5. The highest density of TRPC1 protein is found in the lateral septum, an area with dense TRPC4 expression, and hippocampus and prefrontal cortex, areas with dense TRPC5 expression.

== History ==
TRPC1 was the first mammalian Transient Receptor Potential channel to be identified. In 1995 it was cloned when the research groups headed by Craig Montell and Lutz Birnbaumer were searching for proteins similar to the TRP channel in Drosophila. Together with TRPC3 they became the founding members of the TRPC ion channel family.

== Interactions ==
TRPC1 has been shown to interact with:

- HOMER3,
- Polycystic kidney disease 2,
- RHOA
- TRPC3,
- TRPC4, and
- TRPC5.

== See also ==
- TRPC
