= TRPC3 =

Protein and coding gene in humans

Identifiers
- Aliases: TRPC3, SCA41, TRP3, transient receptor potential cation channel subfamily C member 3
- External IDs: OMIM: 602345; MGI: 109526; GeneCards: TRPC3

Gene location (Human)
| Chr. | Chromosome 4 (human) |
| Band | 4q27 | Start | 121,874,481 bp |
| Band | 4q27 | End | 121,952,060 bp |

Gene location (Mouse)
| Chr. | Chromosome 3 (mouse) |
| Band | 3 B|3 17.93 cM | Start | 36,674,631 bp |
| Band | 3 B|3 17.93 cM | End | 36,744,316 bp |
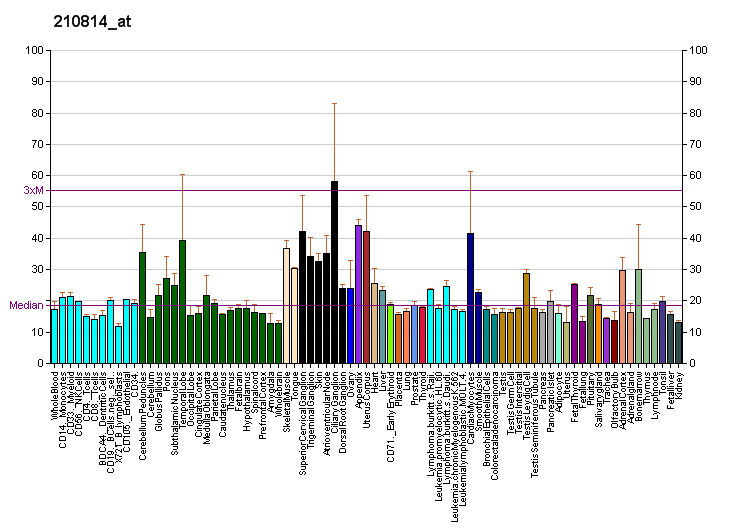

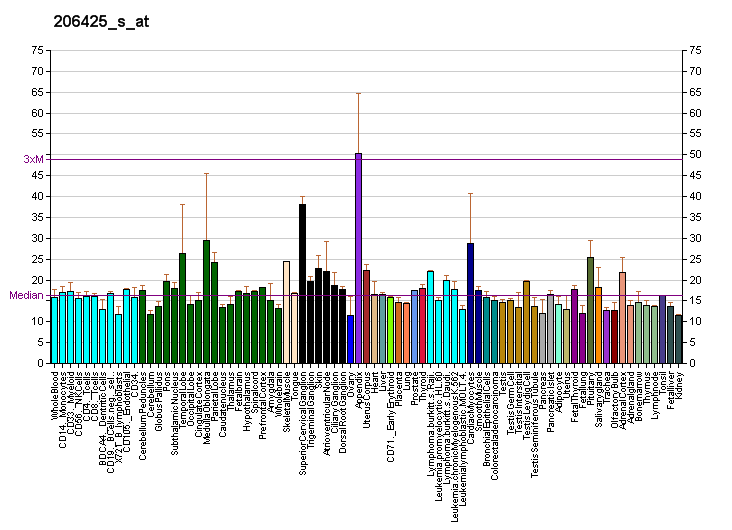
RNA expression pattern
| Bgee | Human / Mouse (ortholog); Top expressed in: buccal mucosa cell; secondary oocyte; endothelial cell; pituitary gland; testicle; anterior pituitary; ventricular zone; gastric mucosa; gonad; putamen / Top expressed in: lobe of cerebellum; lumbar spinal ganglion; cerebellar vermis; medial dorsal nucleus; lateral geniculate nucleus; medial geniculate nucleus; lateral septal nucleus; medial vestibular nucleus; nucleus of stria terminalis; superior colliculus; More reference expression data |
| BioGPS | More reference expression data |
Gene ontology
| Molecular function | store-operated calcium channel activity; calcium channel activity; inositol 1,4,5 trisphosphate binding; ion channel activity; protein binding |
| Cellular component | integral component of membrane; membrane; plasma membrane; integral component of plasma membrane; cation channel complex |
| Biological process | response to ATP; positive regulation of calcium ion transport into cytosol; ion transport; single fertilization; platelet activation; response to calcium ion; calcium ion transmembrane transport; positive regulation of cardiac muscle hypertrophy in response to stress; manganese ion transport; calcium ion transport; phototransduction; transmembrane transport; regulation of cytosolic calcium ion concentration |
Sources:Amigo / QuickGO
Orthologs
| Databases | NCBI: entry; OMA: entry |
| Species | Human | Mouse |
| Entrez | 7222 | 22065 |
| Ensembl | ENSG00000138741 | ENSMUSG00000027716 |
| UniProt | Q13507 | Q9QZC1 |
| RefSeq (mRNA) | NM_001130698; NM_003305; NM_001366479 | NM_019510 |
| RefSeq (protein) | NP_001124170; NP_003296; NP_001353408 | n/a |
| Location (UCSC) | Chr 4: 121.87 – 121.95 Mb | Chr 3: 36.67 – 36.74 Mb |
| PubMed search |
- Wikidata
| View/Edit Human | View/Edit Mouse |

Short transient receptor potential channel 3 (TrpC3) also known as transient receptor protein 3 (TRP-3) is a protein that in humans is encoded by the TRPC3 gene. The TRPC3/6/7 subfamily are implicated in the regulation of vascular tone, cell growth, proliferation and pathological hypertrophy. These are diacylglycerol-sensitive cation channels known to regulate intracellular calcium via activation of the phospholipase C (PLC) pathway and/or by sensing Ca2+ store depletion. Together, their role in calcium homeostasis has made them potential therapeutic targets for a variety of central and peripheral pathologies.

== Function ==
Non-specific cation conductance elicited by the activation of TrkB by BDNF is TRPC3-dependent in the CNS. TRPC channels are almost always co-localized with mGluR1-expressing cells and likely play a role in mGluR-mediated EPSPs.

The TRPC3 channel has been shown to be preferentially expressed in non-excitable cell types, such as oligodendrocytes. However, evidence suggests that active TRPC3 channels in basal ganglia (BG) output neurons are responsible for maintaining a tonic inward depolarizing current that regulates resting membrane potential and promotes regular neuronal firing. Conversely, inhibiting TRPC3 promotes cellular hyperpolarization, which can lead to slower and more irregular neuronal firing. While it's unclear if TRPC3 channels have equal expression, other members of the TRPC family have been localized to the axon hillock, cell body, and dendritic processes of dopamine-expressing cells.

The neuromodulator, substance P, activates TRPC3/7 channels inducing cellular currents that underlie rhythmic pacemaker activity in the brainstem, enhancing the regularity and frequency of respiratory rhythms, showing homology to the mechanism described in BG neurons. Transgenic cardiomyocytes expressing TRPC3 show prolonged action potential duration when exposed to a TRPC3 agonist. The same cardiomyocytes also increase their firing rate with agonist exposure under a current-clamp tetanus protocol suggesting that they may play a role in cardiac arrhythmogenesis.

== Modulators ==
A small molecule agonist is GSK1702934A and antagonists are GSK417651A and GSK2293017A. A commercially available inhibitor is available in the form of a pyrazole compound, Pyr3 TRPC3 has been shown to specifically interact with TRPC1 and TRPC6.

== See also ==
- Transient receptor potential channel
- TRPC
