= Nanchung =

Nanchung is an invertebrate TRP channel that acts to sense mechanical force. Drosophila nanchung mutants show deficits in antennal sensation, including hearing and hygrosensation, and are unable to transduce sound stimuli.
