= Inactive =

Inactive is a TRPV channel in invertebrates. Inactive mutant flies show locomotor and hearing deficits.
