= TRPC =

Family of transient receptor potential cation channels in animals

TRPC is a family of transient receptor potential cation channels in animals.

TRPC channels form the subfamily of channels in humans most closely related to drosophila TRP channels. Structurally, members of this family possess a number of similar characteristics, including 3 or 4 ankyrin repeats near the N-terminus and a TRP box motif containing the invariant EWKFAR sequence at the proximal C-terminus. These channels are non-selectively permeable to cations, with a prevalence of calcium over sodium variable among the different members. Many of TRPC channel subunits are able to coassemble. The predominant TRPC channels in the mammalian brain are the TRPC 1,4 and 5 and they are densely expressed in corticolimbic brain regions, like the hippocampus, prefrontal cortex and lateral septum. These 3 channels are activated by the metabotropic glutamate receptor 1 agonist dihydroxyphenylglycine.

In general, TRPC channels can be activated by phospholipase C stimulation, with some members also activated by diacylglycerol. There is at least one report that TRPC1 is also activated by stretching of the membrane and TRPC5 channels are activated by extracellular reduced thioredoxin.

It has long been proposed that TRPC channels underlie the calcium release activated channels observed in many cell types. These channels open due to the depletion of intracellular calcium stores. Two other proteins, stromal interaction molecules (STIMs) and Orais, however, have more recently been implicated in this process. STIM1 and TRPC1 can coassemble, complicating the understanding of this phenomenon.

TRPC6 has been implicated in late onset Alzheimer's disease.

== Role in cardiomyopathies ==
Research on the role of TRPC channels in cardiomyopathies is still in progress. An upregulation of TRPC1, TRPC3, and TRPC6 genes are seen in heart disease states including fibroblast formation and cardiovascular disease. The TRPC channels are suspected of responding to an overload of hormonal and mechanical stimulation in cardiovascular disease, contributing to pathological remodelling of the heart.

TRPC1 channels are activated by receptors coupled to phospholipase C (PLC), mechanical stimulation, and depletion of intracellular calcium stores. TRPC1 channels are found on cardiomyocytes, smooth muscle, and endothelial cells. Upon stimulation of these channels in cardiovascular disease, there is an increase in hypertension and cardiac hypertrophy. TRPC1 channels mediate smooth muscle proliferation in the presence of pathological stimuli which contributes to hypertension. Mice with myocardial hypertrophy exhibit increased expression of TRPC1. The deletion of the TRPC1 gene in these mice resulted in reduced hypertrophy upon stimulation with hypertrophic stimuli, inferring that TRPC1 has a role in the progression of cardiac hypertrophy.

TRPC3 and TRPC6 channels are activated by PLC stimulation and diacylglycerol (DAG) production. Both these TRPC channel types play a role in cardiac hypertrophy and vascular disease like TRPC1. In addition, TRPC3 is upregulated in the atria of patients with atrial fibrillation (AF). TRPC3 regulates angiotensin II-induced cardiac hypertrophy which contributes to the formation of fibroblasts. Accumulation of fibroblasts in the heart can manifest into AF. Experiments blocking TRPC3 show a decrease in fibroblast formation and reduced AF susceptibility.

TRPC1, TRPC3, and TRPC6 channels are all involved in cardiac hypertrophy. The mechanism of how TRPC channels promote cardiac hypertrophy is through activation of the calcineurin pathway and the downstream transcription factor nuclear factor of activated T-cells (NFAT).

Pathological stress or hypertrophic agonists will trigger G-protein coupled receptors (GPCRs) and activates PLC to form DAG and inositol triphosphate (IP3). IP3 promotes the release of internal calcium stores and the influx of calcium via TRPC. When intracellular calcium reaches a threshold, it will activate the calcineurin /NFAT pathway. DAG activates the calcineurin/NFAT pathway directly. NFAT translocate into the nucleus and induce gene transcription of more TRPC genes. This creates a positive feedback loop, leading to a state of hypertrophic gene expression and thus, cardiac growth and remodelling of the heart. TRPC channel's involvement in well studied signaling pathways and significance in gene impact on human diseases make it a potential target for drug therapy. TRPC has been shown to potentiate inhibition in the olfactory bulb circuit, providing a mechanism for improving olfactory abilities.

== Genes ==
- TRPC1, TRPC2, TRPC3, TRPC4, TRPC5, TRPC6, TRPC7

== Drug development ==
Nyrada Inc.'s lead compound Xolatryp (NYR-BI03) – a selective TRPC3/6/7 inhibitor – is under development for cardioprotection (protecting heart tissue after myocardial infarction) and neuroprotection. A Phase I trial of Xolatryp in healthy volunteers was completed in 2025 with results showing the drug was safe and well-tolerated. A Phase IIa clinical trial in acute myocardial infarction (to assess cardioprotective efficacy) is planned to commence in the first quarter of 2026 (around March 2026). Meanwhile, Boehringer Ingelheim's BI 764198, a selective TRPC6 inhibitor developed for focal segmental glomerulosclerosis (FSGS, a kidney disease), achieved positive Phase II results, demonstrating reduced proteinuria (excess protein in urine) and good tolerability in patients. This was the first clinical evidence that blocking TRPC channels can be effective in human disease, highlighting growing pharmaceutical interest in TRPC-targeted therapies.
