= TRPC6 =

Protein and coding gene in humans

Identifiers
- Aliases: TRPC6, FSGS2, TRP6, transient receptor potential cation channel subfamily C member 6
- External IDs: OMIM: 603652; MGI: 109523; GeneCards: TRPC6

Gene location (Human)
| Chr. | Chromosome 11 (human) |
| Band | 11q22.1 | Start | 101,451,564 bp |
| Band | 11q22.1 | End | 101,872,562 bp |

Gene location (Mouse)
| Chr. | Chromosome 9 (mouse) |
| Band | 9 A1|9 2.46 cM | Start | 8,544,143 bp |
| Band | 9 A1|9 2.46 cM | End | 8,680,742 bp |
RNA expression pattern
| Bgee | Human / Mouse (ortholog); Top expressed in: right lung; upper lobe of left lung; right uterine tube; testicle; left lobe of thyroid gland; right lobe of thyroid gland; Achilles tendon; stromal cell of endometrium; visceral pleura; subcutaneous adipose tissue / Top expressed in: lumbar spinal ganglion; right lobe of liver; dentate gyrus of hippocampal formation granule cell; lens; cumulus cell; substantia nigra; embryo; hippocampus proper; left lung lobe; body of femur; More reference expression data |
| BioGPS | n/a |
Gene ontology
| Molecular function | actinin binding; store-operated calcium channel activity; clathrin binding; inositol 1,4,5 trisphosphate binding; ion channel activity; protein binding; actin binding; calcium channel activity; cation channel activity; protein homodimerization activity; ATPase binding |
| Cellular component | cytoplasm; integral component of membrane; membrane; plasma membrane; integral component of plasma membrane; slit diaphragm; cation channel complex |
| Biological process | regulation of cytosolic calcium ion concentration; positive regulation of cytosolic calcium ion concentration; ageing; cation transport; ion transport; single fertilization; platelet activation; positive regulation of ion transmembrane transporter activity; negative regulation of dendrite morphogenesis; positive regulation of peptidyl-threonine phosphorylation; calcium ion transmembrane transport; positive regulation of neuron differentiation; neuron differentiation; manganese ion transport; cellular response to hypoxia; calcium ion transport; cellular response to hydrogen peroxide; positive regulation of calcium ion transport; transmembrane transport |
Sources:Amigo / QuickGO
Orthologs
| Databases | NCBI: entry; OMA: entry |
| Species | Human | Mouse |
| Entrez | 7225 | 22068 |
| Ensembl | ENSG00000137672 | ENSMUSG00000031997 |
| UniProt | Q9Y210 | Q61143 |
| RefSeq (mRNA) | NM_004621 | NM_001282086; NM_001282087; NM_013838 |
| RefSeq (protein) | NP_004612 | NP_001269015; NP_001269016; NP_038866 |
| Location (UCSC) | Chr 11: 101.45 – 101.87 Mb | Chr 9: 8.54 – 8.68 Mb |
| PubMed search |
- Wikidata
| View/Edit Human | View/Edit Mouse |

Transient receptor potential cation channel, subfamily C, member 6 or Transient receptor potential canonical 6, also known as TRPC6, is a protein encoded in the human by the TRPC6 gene. TRPC6 is a transient receptor potential channel of the classical TRPC subfamily.

TRPC6 channels are nonselective cation channels that respond directly to diacylglycerol (DAG), a product of phospholipase C activity. This activation leads to cellular depolarization and calcium influx.

Unlike the closely related TRPC3 channels, TRPC6 channels possess the distinctive ability to transport heavy metal ions. TRPC6 channels facilitate the transport of zinc ions, promoting their accumulation inside cells. In addition, despite their non-selectiveness, TRPC6 exhibits a strong preference for calcium ions, with a permeability ratio of calcium to sodium (P_{Ca}/P_{Na}) of roughly six. This selectivity is significantly higher compared to TRPC3, which displays a weaker preference for calcium with a (P_{Ca}/P_{Na}) ratio of only 1.1.

== Function ==
TRPC6 channels are widely distributed in the human body and are emerging as crucial regulators of several key physiological functions.

=== In blood vessels ===
Small arteries and arterioles exhibit a self-regulatory mechanism called myogenic tone, enabling them to maintain relatively stable blood flow despite fluctuating intravascular pressures. When intravascular pressure within a small artery or arteriole increases, the vessel walls automatically constrict. This narrowing reduces blood flow, effectively counteracting the rising pressure and stabilizing overall flow. Conversely, if blood pressure suddenly drops, vasodilation occurs to allow more blood flow and compensate for the decrease.

TRPC6 channels are present both in endothelial and smooth muscle cells, and their function is similar to α‑adrenoreceptors; they are both involved in vasoconstriction. However, TPRC6-mediated vasoconstriction is mechanosensetive (i.e. activated by mechanical stimulation) and these channels are involved in maintenance of the myogenic tone of blood vessels and autoregulation of blood flow.

When intravascular blood pressure rises, this causes stretching of the walls of blood vessels. This mechanical stretch activates the TRPC6 channel. Once activated, TRPC6 allows Ca^{2+} to enter the smooth muscle cells. This increase in intracellular Ca^{2+} triggers a chain reaction leading to vasoconstriction.

=== In the kidneys ===
TRPC6 channels are extensively present throughout the kidney, both in the tubular segments and the glomeruli. Within the glomeruli, expression of TRPC6 is primarily concentrated in podocytes. Despite being extensively expressed throughout the kidneys and despite the established link between TRPC6 over-activation and kidney pathologies, the physiological roles of this channel in healthy kidney function remain less understood. Podocytes normally display minimal baseline activity of TRPC6 channels and TRPC6 knockout mice have not shown any evident changes in glomerular structure or filtration.

Nevertheless, it has been hypothesized that the function of TRPC6 channels in podocytes resembles their function in smooth muscles of blood vessels.

Glomerular capillaries operate under significantly higher pressure than most other capillary beds. When podocytes are stretched by glomerular capillary pressure, mechanosensitive TRPC6 channels trigger a surge in Ca^{2+} influx into podocytes, causing them to contract. This podocyte contraction exerts a force that opposes capillary wall overstretching and distention, that would otherwise lead to protein leakage.

However, in order to control the degree of podocyte contraction and maintain blood vessel patency, the influx of Ca^{2+} mediated by TRPC6 channels is accompanied by an increase in the activity of big potassium (BK) channels, leading to the efflux of K^{+}. BK channel activation and the resultant K^{+} efflux mitigate and counteract the depolarization induced by TRPC6 activation, potentially serving as a protective mechanism through regulation of membrane depolarization and limiting podocyte contraction.

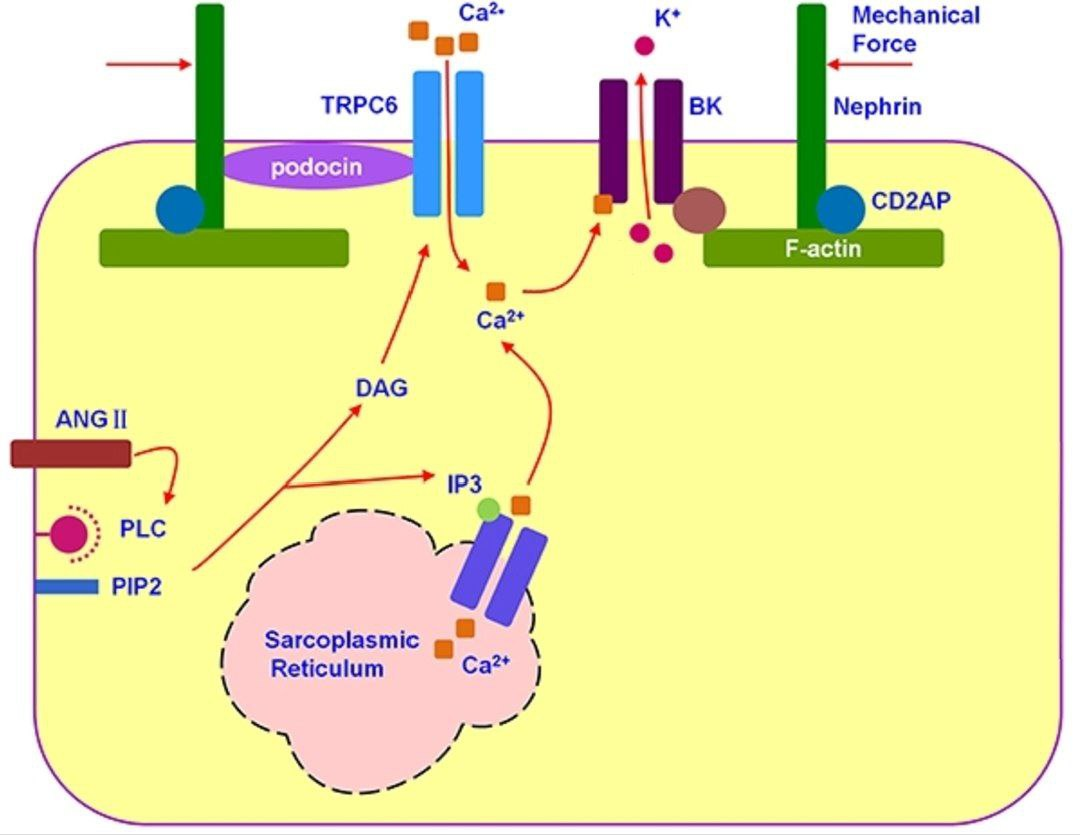
As shown in the left portion of the figure, angiotensin II (Ang II) activates phospholipase C (PLC), which cleaves phosphatidylinositol 4,5-bisphosphate (PIP_{2}) into diacyl glycerol (DAG) and inositol 1,4,5-trisphosphate (IP_{3}). DAG activates TRPC6 channels, and IP_{3} binds to its receptor on the endoplasmic reticulum. Both DAG and IP_{3} lead to increased cytosolic calcium concentration. This, in turn, leads to activation of BK channels, and subsequently K^{+} efflux. The upper side of the figure illustrates that TRPC6 interaction with podocyte-specific proteins such as nephrin, podocin and CD2AP allows this channel to be mechanosensitive, and hence TRPC6 channels can be activated by both chemical and mechanical stimuli.

=== In the central nervous system ===
Research of learning and memory mechanisms suggests that a continuous increase in the strength of synaptic transmission is necessary to achieve long-term modification of neural network properties and memory storage. TRPC6 appears to be essential for the formation of an excitatory synapse; overexpressing TRPC6 greatly increased dendritic spine density and the level of synapsin I and PSD-95 cluster, known as the pre- and postsynaptic markers.

TRPC6 has also been proven to participate in neuroprotection and its neuroprotective effect could be explained due to the antagonism of extrasynaptic NMDA receptor (NMDAR)-mediated intracellular calcium overload. TRPC6 activates calcineurin, which impedes the NMDAR activity.

Hyperactivation of NMDAR is a critical event in glutamate-driven excitotoxicity that causes a rapid increase in intracellular calcium concentration. Such rapid increases in cytoplasmic calcium concentrations may activate and over-stimulate a variety of proteases, kinases, endonucleases, etc. This downstream neurotoxic cascade may trigger severe damage to neuronal functioning. Hyperactivation of NMDAR is frequently observed during brain ischemia and late stage Alzheimer's disease.

== Clinical significance ==
Since TRPC6 channels play a multifaceted role by participating in various signaling pathways, these channels are emerging as key players in the pathogenesis of a wide range of diseases including:

1. Kidney diseases
  - Proteinuria
  - Focal segmental glomerulosclerosis
  - Diabetic nephropathy
2. Disorders of the nervous system
  - Alzheimer's disease
  - Autism spectrum disorders
  - Brain ischemia
3. Cancers
  - Breast cancer
  - Esophageal cancer
  - Lung cancer
  - Liver cancer
  - Renal cell carcinoma
4. Cardiovascular diseases
  - Heart failure
  - Hypertrophic cardiomyopathy
  - Coronary artery disease
5. Pulmonary diseases
  - Pulmonary hypertension
  - COVID-19
  - Airway inflammation
  - Chronic obstructive pulmonary disease
  - Lung fibrosis

== Interactions ==
TRPC6 has been shown to interact with:

- APP,
- FYN,
- TRPC2, and
- TRPC3.

== Ligands ==
Two of the primary active constituents responsible for the antidepressant and anxiolytic benefits of Hypericum perforatum, also known as St. John's Wort, are hyperforin and adhyperforin. These compounds are inhibitors of the reuptake of serotonin, norepinephrine, dopamine, γ-aminobutyric acid, and glutamate, and they are reported to exert these effects by binding to and activating TRPC6. Recent results with hyperforin have cast doubt on these findings as similar currents are seen upon Hyperforin treatment regardless of the presence of TRPC6.
