= TRPV =

Subgroup of TRP cation channels named after the vanilloid receptor

Transient receptor potential (TRP) ion channel
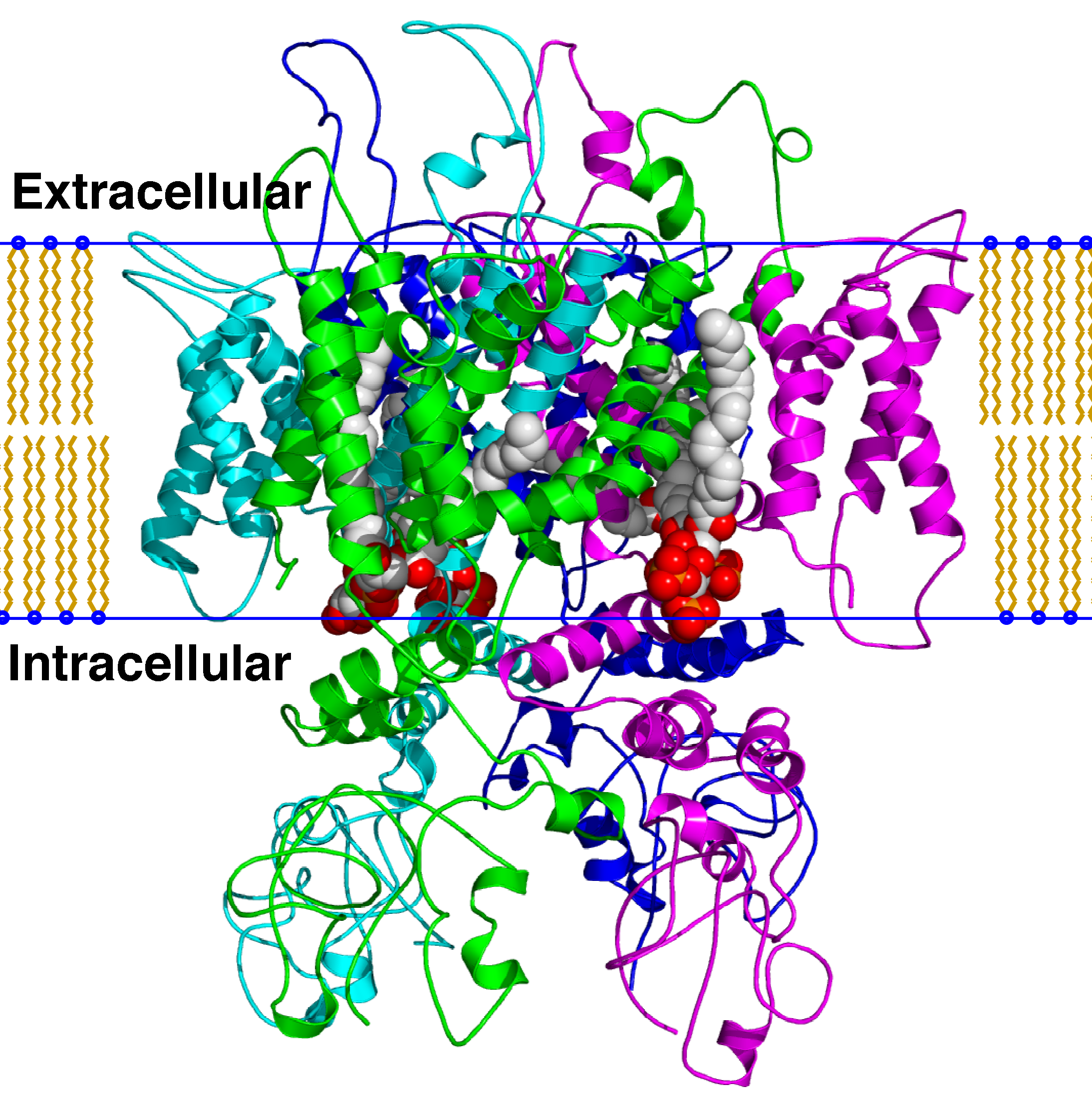
- Homology model of the TRPV1 ion channel tetramer (where the monomers are individually colored cyan, green, blue, and magenta respective) imbedded in a cartoon representation of a lipid bilayer. PIP_{2} signaling ligands are represented by space-filling models (carbon = white, oxygen = red, phosphorus = orange).

Identifiers
- Symbol: TRP
- Pfam: PF06011
- InterPro: IPR010308
Available protein structures:
- PDB: IPR010308 PF06011 (ECOD; PDBsum)
- AlphaFold: IPR010308; PF06011

TRPV is a family of transient receptor potential cation channels (TRP channels) in animals. All TRPVs are highly calcium selective.

TRP channels are a large group of ion channels consisting of six protein families, located mostly on the plasma membrane of numerous human and animal cell types, and in some fungi. TRP channels were initially discovered in the trp mutant strain of the fruit fly Drosophila that displayed transient elevation of potential in response to light stimuli, and were therefore named "transient receptor potential" channels. The name now refers only to a family of proteins with similar structure and function, not to the mechanism of their activation. Later, TRP channels were found in vertebrates where they are ubiquitously expressed in many cell types and tissues. There are about 28 TRP channels that share some structural similarity to each other. These are grouped into two broad groups: group 1 includes TRPC ( "C" for canonical), TRPV ("V" for vanilloid), TRPM ("M" for melastatin), TRPN and TRPA. In group 2 there are TRPP ("P" for polycystic) and TRPML ("ML" for mucolipin).

== Structure ==
Functional TRPV ion channels are tetrameric in structure and are either homo-tetrameric (four identical subunits) or hetero-tetrameric (a total of four subunits selected from two or more types of subunits). The four subunits are symmetrically arranged around the ion conduction pore. Although the extent of heteromerization has been the subject of some debate, the most recent research in this area suggest that all four thermosensitive TRPVs (1-4) can form heteromers with each other. This result is in line with the general observation that TRP coassembly tends to occur between subunits with high sequence similarities. How TRP subunits recognize and interact with each other is still poorly understood.

The TRPV channel monomeric subunit components each contain six transmembrane (TM) domains (designated S1–S6) with a pore domain between the fifth (S5) and sixth (S6) segments. TRPV subunits contain three to five N-terminal ankyrin repeats.

== Function ==
TRPV proteins respond to the taste of garlic (allicin). TRPV1 contributes to heat and inflammation sensations and mediates the pungency and pain sensation associated with capsaicin and piperine.

== Family members ==
The table below summarizes the functions and properties of the individual TRPV channel family members:

group	channel	function	tissue distribution	Ca^{2+}/Na^{+} selectivity	heteromeric associated subunits	other associated proteins
1	TRPV1	vanilloid (capsaicin) receptor and noxious thermosensor (43 °C)	CNS and PNS	9:1	TRPV2, TRPV3	calmodulin, PI3 kinase
1	TRPV2	osmo- and noxious heat thermosensor (52 °C)	CNS, spleen and lung	3:1	TRPV1	
1	TRPV3	warmth sensor channel (33-39 °C)	Skin, CNS and PNS	12:1	TRPV1	
1	TRPV4	osmo- and warmth sensor channel (27-34 °C)	CNS and internal organs; human sperm	6:1		aquaporin 5, calmodulin, pacsin 3
2	TRPV5	calcium-selective TRP channel	intestine, kidney, placenta	100:1	TRPV6	annexin II / S100A10, calmodulin
2	TRPV6	calcium-selective TRP channel	kidney, intestine	130:1	TRPV5	annexin II / S100A10, calmodulin

== Clinical significance ==
Mutations in TRPs have been linked to neurodegenerative disorders, skeletal dysplasia, kidney disorders, and may play an important role in cancer. TRPs may make important therapeutic targets. There is significant clinical significance to TRPV1, TRPV2, and TRPV3's role as thermoreceptors, and TRPV4's role as mechanoreceptors; reduction of chronic pain may be possible by targeting ion channels involved in thermal, chemical, and mechanical sensation to reduce their sensitivity to stimuli. For instance, the use of TRPV1 agonists would potentially inhibit nociception at TRPV1, particularly in pancreatic tissue where TRPV1 is highly expressed. The TRPV1 agonist capsaicin, found in chili peppers, has been indicated to relieve neuropathic pain. TRPV1 antagonists inhibit nociception at TRPV1.

== Role in cancer ==
Altered expression of TRP proteins often leads to tumorigenesis, clearly seen in TRPM1. Particularly high levels of TRPV6 in prostate cancer have been noted. Such observations could be helpful in following cancer progression and could lead to the development of drugs over activating ion channels, leading to apoptosis and necrosis. Much research remains to be done as to whether TRP channel mutations lead to cancer progression or whether they are associated mutations.

== As drug targets ==
Four TRPVs (TRPV1, TRPV2, TRPV3, and TRPV4) are expressed in afferent nociceptors, pain sensing neurons, where they act as transducers of thermal and chemical stimuli. Agonists, antagonists, or modulators of these channels may find application for the prevention and treatment of pain. A number of TRPV1 selective agonists and antagonists such as resiniferatoxin were in clinical trials for the treatment of various types of pain.

== See also ==
- Discovery and development of TRPV1 antagonists
- TRPA1
