= Joost Hoenderop =

Dutch physiologist

- Education: Radboud University Nijmegen (PhD, 2000)
- Known for: Identification of the calcium channel TRPV5
- Scientific career
- Fields: Physiology, nephrology
- Workplaces: Radboud University Medical Center

Joost G. J. Hoenderop is a Dutch physiologist and professor of molecular renal physiology at Radboud University Medical Center in Nijmegen. He studies how the kidney and the intestine take up calcium and magnesium. As a PhD student he identified the calcium channel now known as TRPV5.

== Education and career ==
Hoenderop received his PhD in medical sciences from the University of Nijmegen in 2000, cum laude, with a thesis on the molecular basis of calcium handling in the kidney. From 2000 to 2001 he was an EMBO long-term fellow at the Institute of Pharmacology and Toxicology of the University of Lausanne.

He returned to Nijmegen in 2001 as an assistant professor of physiology and became an associate professor in 2006. In July 2010 he was appointed full professor of molecular renal physiology. In 2014 he became chair of the Renal Disorders research theme at Radboudumc.

He also teaches at the medical school in Nijmegen, and received the Radboud University Teaching Prize for senior lecturers in 2019.

== Research ==
=== Calcium ===
In 1999 Hoenderop and colleagues described a calcium channel in rabbit kidney cells that respond to calcitriol, the active form of vitamin D. The channel was first called ECaC and was later renamed TRPV5. It is the entry route for the active reabsorption of calcium in the kidney. During his fellowship in Lausanne he worked on mice that lack TRPV5. These mice lose large amounts of calcium in their urine and have thinner bones.

In 2005 his group reported in Science that the protein Klotho activates TRPV5. HealthDay reported on the study, with comment from the Johns Hopkins neuroscientist Michael Caterina.

=== Magnesium ===
His group also works on magnesium transport. A 2004 study with Hoenderop as senior author showed that TRPM6 forms the channel through which magnesium is absorbed in the intestine and the kidney. He co-wrote review articles on magnesium in Physiological Reviews in 2015 and in The New England Journal of Medicine in 2024. In 2024 he explained magnesium deficiency and supplements to a general audience in the Dutch popular science magazine Quest.

== Awards and memberships ==
- 2006: European Young Investigator Award (EURYI) from the European Science Foundation
- 2013: Vici grant from the Dutch Research Council
- 2018: elected member of Academia Europaea
- 2019: Radboud University Teaching Prize

He was also a member of De Jonge Akademie, the young academy of the Royal Netherlands Academy of Arts and Sciences.

== Selected publications ==
- Hoenderop, J. G. J.; van der Kemp, A. W. C. M.; Hartog, A.; et al. (1999). "Molecular identification of the apical Ca2+ channel in 1,25-dihydroxyvitamin D3-responsive epithelia". Journal of Biological Chemistry. 274 (13): 8375–8378. doi:10.1074/jbc.274.13.8375. hdl:2066/216409.
- Hoenderop, J. G. J.; van Leeuwen, J. P. T. M.; van der Eerden, B. C. J.; et al. (2003). "Renal Ca2+ wasting, hyperabsorption, and reduced bone thickness in mice lacking TRPV5". Journal of Clinical Investigation. 112 (12): 1906–1914. doi:10.1172/JCI19826. PMC 297001.
- Chang, Q.; Hoefs, S.; van der Kemp, A. W.; et al. (2005). "The β-glucuronidase klotho hydrolyzes and activates the TRPV5 channel". Science. 310 (5747): 490–493. doi:10.1126/science.1114245.
- de Baaij, J. H. F.; Hoenderop, J. G. J.; Bindels, R. J. M. (2015). "Magnesium in man: implications for health and disease". Physiological Reviews. 95 (1): 1–46. doi:10.1152/physrev.00012.2014.
- Touyz, R. M.; de Baaij, J. H. F.; Hoenderop, J. G. J. (2024). "Magnesium disorders". The New England Journal of Medicine. 390 (21): 1998–2009. doi:10.1056/NEJMra1510603. hdl:2066/307615.
