= TRPV6 =

Protein found in humans

Identifiers
- Aliases: TRPV6, ABP/ZF, CAT1, CATL, ECAC2, HSA277909, LP6728, ZFAB, transient receptor potential cation channel subfamily V member 6, HRPTTN
- External IDs: OMIM: 606680; MGI: 1927259; GeneCards: TRPV6
Available structures
PDB	Ortholog search: PDBe RCSB
PDB	List of PDB id codes 2RFA

Gene location (Human)
Chr.	Chromosome 7 (human)
Band	7q34	Start	142,871,208 bp
Band	7q34	End	142,885,745 bp

Gene location (Mouse)
Chr.	Chromosome 6 (mouse)
Band	6|6 B2.1	Start	41,597,558 bp
Band	6|6 B2.1	End	41,613,339 bp
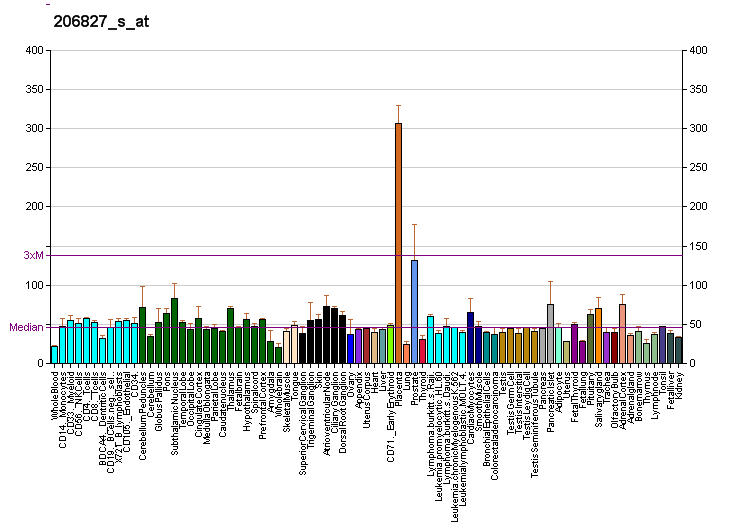
RNA expression pattern
Bgee	Human / Mouse (ortholog); Top expressed in: body of pancreas; duodenum; placenta; prostate; islet of Langerhans; gallbladder; skin of abdomen; primary visual cortex; salivary gland; skin of leg / Top expressed in: seminal vesicula; duodenum; lip; lacrimal gland; cervix; parotid gland; conjunctival fornix; medullary collecting duct; embryo; embryo; More reference expression data
BioGPS	More reference expression data
Gene ontology
Molecular function	ion channel activity; protein binding; calmodulin binding; calcium channel activity; metal ion binding
Cellular component	integral component of membrane; plasma membrane; membrane; integral component of plasma membrane
Biological process	ion transport; calcium ion transport; regulation of calcium ion-dependent exocytosis; response to calcium ion; calcium ion transmembrane transport; transmembrane transport; calcium ion homeostasis; calcium ion import across plasma membrane
Sources:Amigo / QuickGO
Orthologs
Databases	NCBI: entry; OMA: entry
Species	Human	Mouse
Entrez	55503	64177
Ensembl	ENSG00000276971; ENSG00000165125	ENSMUSG00000029868
UniProt	Q9H1D0	Q91WD2
RefSeq (mRNA)	NM_018646; NM_014274	NM_022413
RefSeq (protein)	NP_061116	NP_071858
Location (UCSC)	Chr 7: 142.87 – 142.89 Mb	Chr 6: 41.6 – 41.61 Mb
PubMed search
- Wikidata
View/Edit Human	View/Edit Mouse

TRPV6 is a membrane calcium (Ca^{2+}) channel protein which is particularly involved in the first step in Ca^{2+}absorption in the intestine.

== Classification ==
Transient Receptor Potential Vanilloid subfamily member 6 (TRPV6) is an epithelial Ca^{2+} channel that belongs to the transient receptor potential family (TRP) of proteins. The TRP family is a group of channel proteins critical for ionic homeostasis and the perception of various physical and chemical stimuli. TRP channels can detect temperature, osmotic pressure, olfaction, taste, and mechanical forces. The human genome encodes for 28 TRP channels, which include six TRPV channels. The high Ca^{2+}-selectivity of TRPV5 and TRPV6 makes these channels distinct from the other four TRPV channels (TRPV1-TRPV4). TRPV5 and TRPV6 are involved in Ca^{2+} transport, whereas TRPV1 through TRPV3 are heat sensors with different temperature threshold for activation, and TRPV4 is involved in sensing osmolarity. Genetic defects in TRPV6 gene are linked to transient neonatal hyperparathyroidism and early-onset chronic pancreatitis. Dysregulation of TRPV6 is also involved in hypercalciuria, kidney stone formation, bone disorders, defects in keratinocyte differentiation, skeletal deformities, osteoarthritis, male sterility, Pendred syndrome, and certain sub-types of Cancer.

== Identification ==
Peng et al identified TRPV6 in 1999 from rat duodenum in an effort to search for Ca^{2+} transporting proteins involved in Ca^{2+}absorption. TRPV6 was also called calcium transport protein 1 (CaT1) initially although the names epithelial calcium channel 2 (ECaC2) and CaT1-like (CaT-L) were also used in early studies to describe the channel. The human and mouse orthologs of TRPV6 were cloned by Peng et al and Weber et al, respectively. The name TRPV6 was confirmed in 2005.

== Gene location, chromosomal location, and phylogeny ==
The human TRPV6 gene is located on chromosomal locus 7q33-34 close to its homolog TRPV5 on 7q35. The TRPV6 gene in human encodes for 2906 bp-long mRNA. In contrast to most other proteins, which initiate translation with an AUG codon, TRPV6 translation is initiated by non-AUG-codon-mediated reading. TRPV6 protein bears a 40-a.a-long N-terminal extension in placenta and in some physiological settings in comparison to the annotated version of the protein used in biological studies. However, it is still to be determined whether the long version of the TRPV6 protein is the dominant form in different tissues.

Chromosomal location and identifiers
Species	Human	Rat	Mouse
Chromosomal location	7q33-q34	4q22	6B2
Annotated aa length	725	727	727
In vivo aa length^{a}	765	767	767
RefSeq nucleotide	NM_018646	NM_053686	NM_022413
RefSeq protein	NP_061116	NP_446138	NP_071858

^{a}To be verified in different tissues.

It has been hypothesized that Trpv5 and Trpv6 genes were generated from a single ancestral gene by gene duplication events. Phylogenetic analysis has shown that TRPV6 paralogs in mammals, sauropsids, amphibians, and chondrichthyes arose out of independent duplication events in the ancestor of each group. It is speculated that two specialized Ca^{2+}-selective Trpv homologs arose as an adaptation to achieve a greater degree of functional specialization for navigating distinct renal challenges of terrestrial animals.

Two alleles of the TRPV6 gene have been identified in humans (originally noted as CaT-La and CaT-Lb). These alleles exhibit coupled polymorphisms generating two versions of the same gene. The polymorphisms give rise to an "ancestral variant" and a "derived variant" that differ in five bases and three amino acids. The ancestral allele codes for C197(157, in parentheses are annotated amino acid numbering), M418(378), and M721(681) whereas the derived allele codes for R197(157), V418 (378) and T721(681). The frequency of the ancestral TRPV6 allele varies across different population groups. It is hypothesized that selection pressures that could have changed TRPV6 allele distribution include changes in patterns of milk consumption, domestication of animals, change in ultraviolet light exposure due to trans-equatorial migration, genomic adaptations providing immune advantages to populations encountering new pathogens.

== Tissue distribution ==
The TRPV6 protein is expressed in epithelial tissues such as the intestine, kidney, placenta, epididymis, and exocrine glands such as pancreas, prostate and salivary, sweat, and mammary glands. TRPV6 protein expression in humans has been demonstrated in the esophagus, stomach, small intestine, colon, pancreas, mammary glands, ovary, thyroid, and prostate by immunohistochemistry approaches. TRPV6 expression mainly confines on the apical membrane of epithelial cells. In the intestine, the protein is expressed on the brush-border membrane of enterocyte.

Differences in the TRPV6 expression profile have been reported possibly due to variation in assay-dependent such primer design, hybridization probes, PCR vs. northern blotting, semi-quantitative PCR vs. RT-PCR, and antibodies used for immunodetection. TRPV6 expression profile is also influenced by age, gender, Ca^{2+} and vitamin D_{3} levels in food, hormonal status, location within the tissue, cellular location, reproductive status, and weaning status (see Section Regulation).

In humans, TRPV6 transcripts have been detected in the placenta, pancreas, prostate cancer, and duodenum and the prostate by northern blotting; and in duodenum, jejunum, placenta, pancreas, testis, kidney, brain, and colon by semi-quantitative PCR. In rodents, TRPV6 expression has been validated in the duodenum, cecum, small intestine, colon, placenta, pancreas, prostate, and epididymis by Northern Blotting. In mouse, TRPV6 transcript abundance measured by RT-PCR is as follows: prostate > stomach, brain > lung > duodenum, cecum, heart, kidney, bone > colon > skeletal muscle > pancreas.

Data from Human Protein Atlas and RNA-Seq based suggest TRPV6 mRNA is low in most tissues except for the placenta, salivary gland, pancreas, and prostate. TRPV6 mRNA is expressed in the apical domain of murine osteoclasts of cortical bone. Cortical and trabecular osteocytes do not express TRPV6 mRNA whereas osteoblasts show weak expression.

== Structure and biophysical properties ==
=== Primary and secondary structure ===
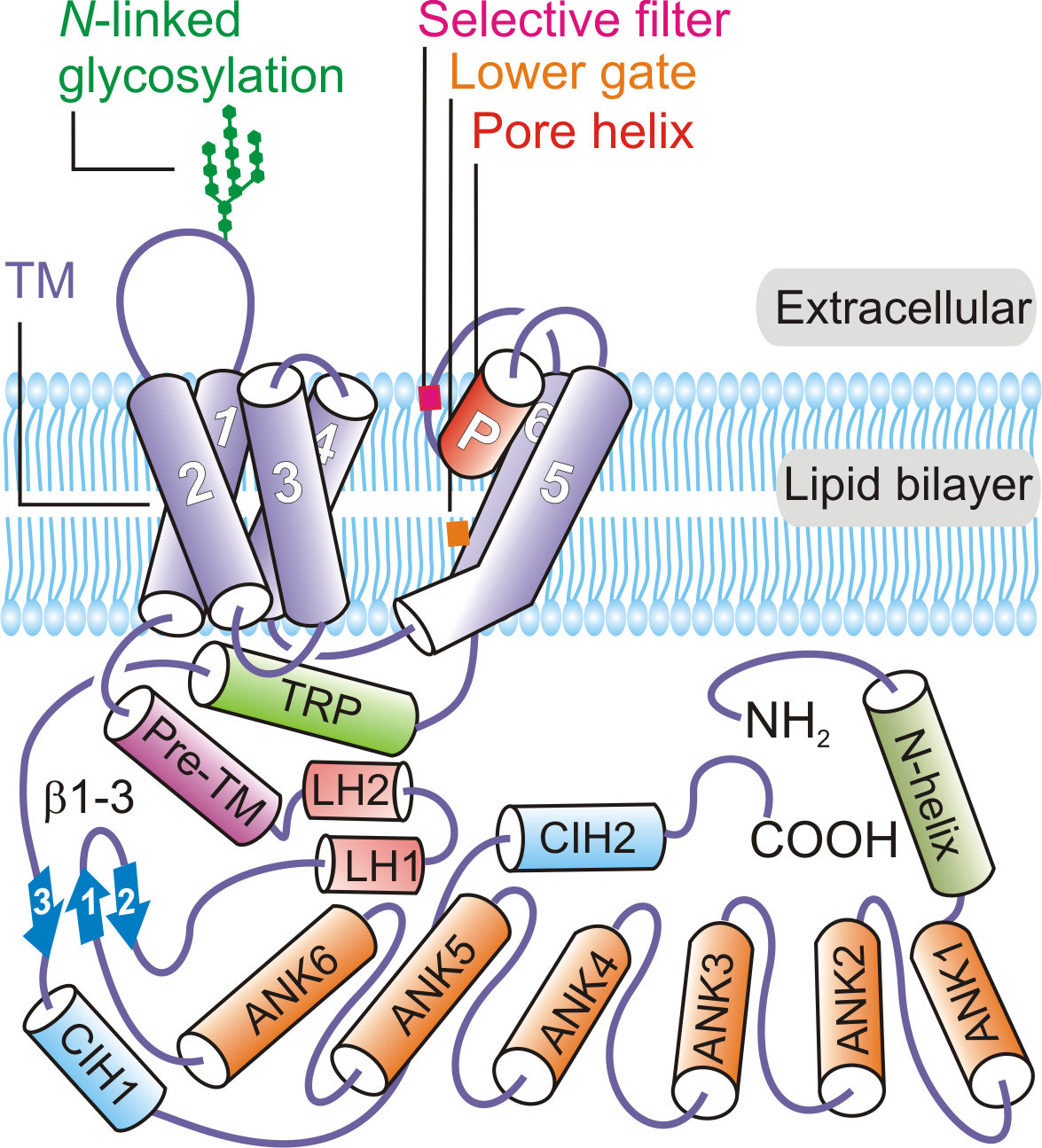
Figure 1. Domain organization of TRPV6. TRPV6 monomer contains the following structure elements: an N-terminal helix, an ankyrin repeat domain with six ankyrin repeats (ANK1-6), a linker domain composed of a β-hairpin (β1 and β2) and two linker helices (LH1 and LH2), a pre-S1 helix connecting the linker domain, and the transmembrane (TM) domain that comprises six TM helices (S1-S6) and a pore helix connecting S5 and S6, an amphipathic TRP helix, a β-strand forms a β-sheet with β1 and β2, and two C-terminal interacting helices (CIH1 and CIH2). The orientation of the domains is based on that of a cryo-electron microscopy structure of human TRPV6 (PBD: 6E2F). The positions of the glycosylation site, the key selective residue in the selective filter, a representative residue in the lower gate are also labeled.

Overall, four subunits of TRPV6 arrange to form a tetrameric channel displaying a four-fold symmetry. Beginning from N-terminus and moving towards the C-terminus of the protein, each TRPV6 polypeptide contains: an N-terminal helix, an ankyrin repeat domain (ARD) containing six ankyrin repeats, a β-hairpin structure linker domain made up two β-strands, a helix-turn-helix motif, a pre-SI helix, TM domain made up of six TM helices (S1 through S6), a pore-loop (also called P-loop), amphipathic TRP helix, C-terminal hook, and a six-residue β-strand (β3) (Figure 1).

=== Tertiary and quaternary structure ===
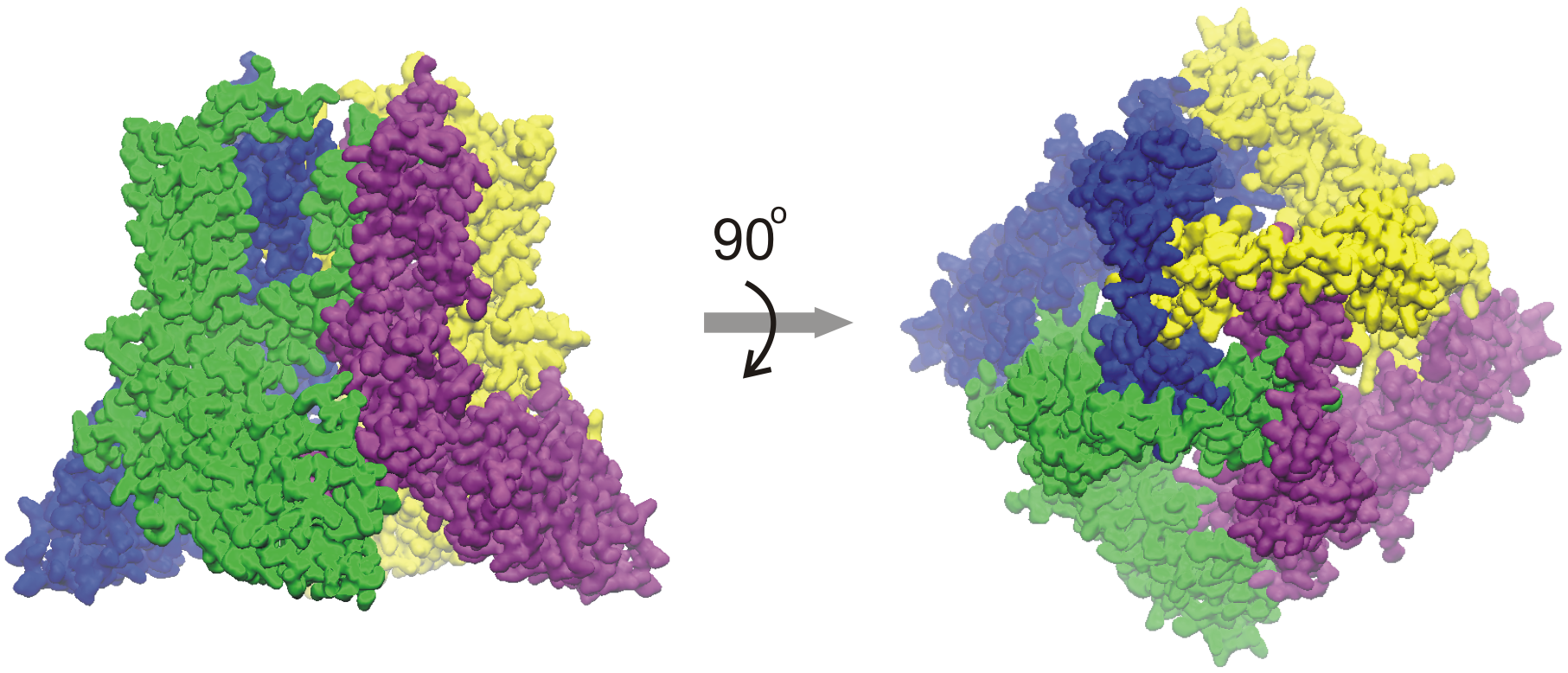
Figure 2. A cryo-electron microscopy structure of human TRPV6 tetramer. Four subunits of TRPV6 arrange to form a four-fold symmetric channel. Shown are cryo-electron microscopy structures of human TRPV6 in open state (PBD: 6BO8). Each subunit is shown in a unique color.

The TRPV6 channel protein displays four-fold symmetry and contains two main compartments: a 30 Å-tall transmembrane domain with a central ion channel pore and a ~70 Å-tall and a ~110 Å-wide intracellular skirt enclosing a 50 Å × 50 Å cavity wide cavity underneath the ion channel. The clustering of four TRPV6 subunits forms an aqueous pore exhibiting a fourfold symmetry (Figure 2). A pre-SI helix links the intracellular portion of the protein to the TM domain through a linker domain made up of β-hairpin structure and a helix-turn-helix motif. Helices S1 through S4 form a transmembrane helical bundle or TM domain that is inserted almost perpendicularly to the plane of the plasma membrane.

The pore module elements are made up of S5, S6, and the P-loop in TM domains. The pore module from each TRPV6 polypeptide participates in inter-subunit interactions to form a central ion pore (Figure 1). The pore-forming elements of each TRPV6 subunit also interact with S1-S4 domains of the adjacent polypeptide in a domain-swapped arrangement. Intersubunit interactions also occur between S1-S2 extracellular loops and S5-P and S6-P loops of the neighboring TRPV6 subunits. The conserved N-linked glycosylation site on the S1-S2 loop is required for by the Klotho-mediated activation. The intracellular skirt portion of the TRPV6 protein is mainly made up of the ankyrin repeats. The TRP domain is oriented parallel to the membrane and participates in hydrophobic interactions with the TM domain and the hydrophilic interactions in the intracellular skirt. The N-terminal helix, C-terminal hook, and β-sheets (formed by the β-hairpin structure in the linker domain) in the channel participates in intersubunit interactions with the ARDs to provides a framework for holding the elements of the intracellular skirt together.

=== Pore architecture and cation binding sites ===
The TRPV6 pore has four main elements, namely, the extracellular vestibule, a selectivity filter, a hydrophobic cavity, and a lower gate. Facing the central lumen of the channel, a four-residue selectivity filter (^{538}TIID^{541}) containing four Aspartate 541 (D541) side chains (one from each protomer) is critical for Ca^{2+} selectivity and other biophysical properties of the channel. This filter forms a negatively charged ring that discriminates between ions based on their size and charge. Mutations in the critical pore-forming residue of TRPV6 blocks Ca^{2+}uptake, a strategy has been used to generate TRPV6 loss-of-function models to examine the role of the channel in animal physiology. Four different types of cation binding sites are thought to exist in the TRPV6 channel. Site 1 is located in the central pore and shares the same plane that is occupied by the key selective residues D541. Site 2 is thought to be present about 6–8 Å below Site 1 followed by Site 3 which is located in the central pore axis about 6.8 Å below Site 2. Site 2 and 3 are thought to interact with partially-hydrated to equatorially-hydrated Ca^{2+} ions. Finally, four symmetrical cation binding sites in the extracellular vestibule mediate the recruitment of cations towards the extracellular vestibule of TRPV6 and are referred to as recruitment sites.

=== Ion permeation ===
The conductance of TRPV6 for divalent cations follows the preference: Ca^{2+} > Ba^{2+} > Sr^{2+} > Mn^{2}. Intra-cellular Mg^{2+} inhibits TRPV6 and contributes to the strong inward rectification exhibited by the channel. TRPV6 uptake activity is inhibited by divalent Pb^{2}, Cu^{2+}, Cd^{2+}, Zn^{2}, Co^{2+}, Fe^{2+}, and trivalent cations La^{3+}, Fe^{3+}, Gd^{3+}. The concentration of ions to achieve the inhibition ranges from 1 to 10 μM. The TRPV6 protein is constitutive with a single-channel conductance of 42–58 ps. At low Ca^{2+} concentrations, a single Ca^{2+} ion binds in the selectivity filter formed by D541 and permits Na^{+} permeation. At high Ca^{2+} concentration, Ca^{2+} permeation occurs by a knock-off mechanism that involves the formation of short-lived conformations involving binding of three Ca^{2+} ions to residue D541.

=== Channel gating ===
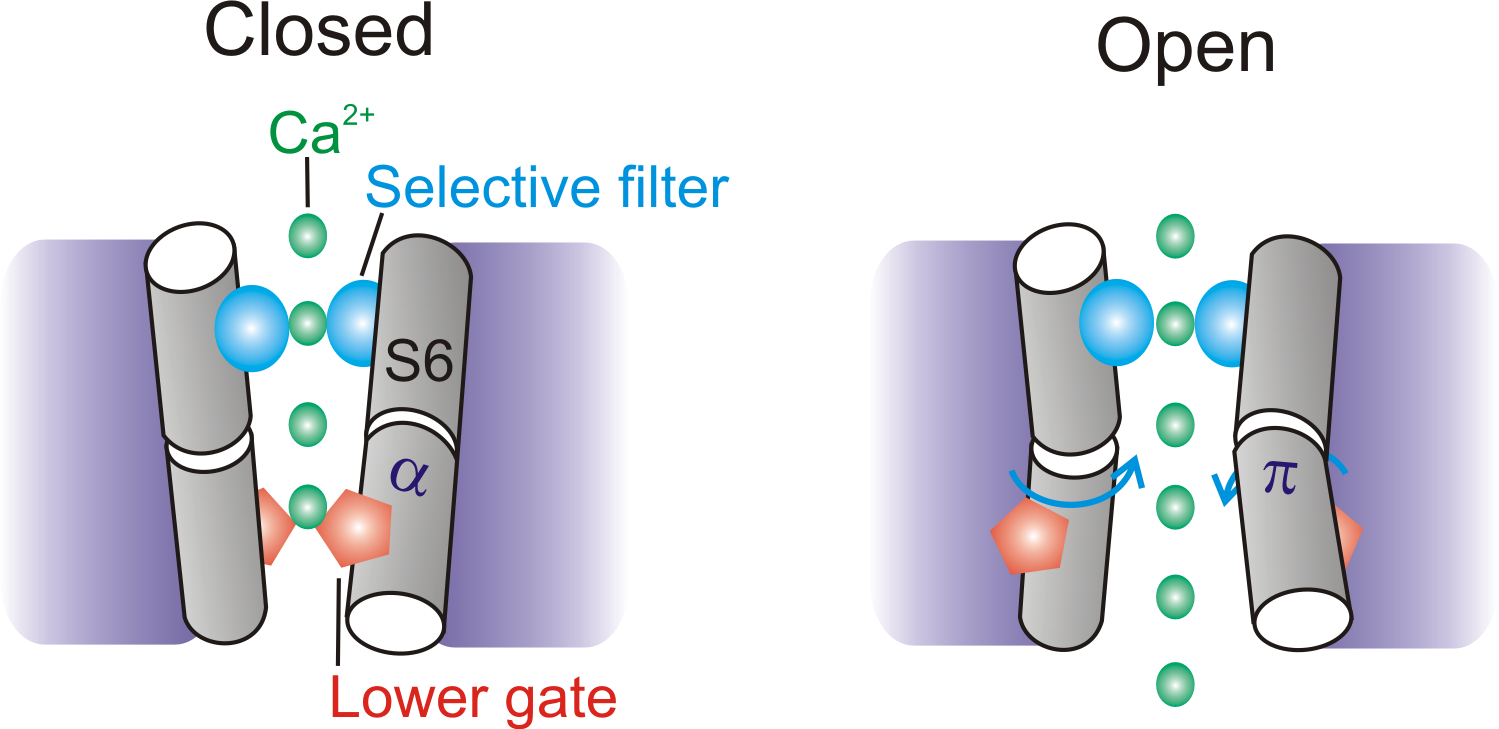
Figure 3. Gating mechanism of TRPV6. Shown are the closed and open conformations of the S6 transmembrane domain of TRPV6. The opening of the lower gate is caused by an α- to the π-helical transition of the transmembrane helix S6 at residue A566, which induces the intracellular part of S6 bends by about 11º and rotates by about 100º. This ensures that the conformation of the selectivity filter is not significantly altered and the ionic selectivity is maintained.

The conformational changes involved in channel opening are hinged around the residue Alanine 566 (A566) and occur in the pore-lining helix S6 (Figure 3). The upper portion of S6 helix undergoes an α-to-π helical transition which forces the lower portion of the helix to turn by 100 degrees and tilt away from the pore axis by 11 degrees. This conformational change moves the lower portion of the helix gating the pore and thereby widens the pore size. The conformational change alters the residues facing the pore axis and triggers the formation of new electrostatic bonds subunit and salt bridges that offset the high energetic cost of unfavorable α-to-π helical transition that occurs during channel opening.

=== Regulation by phosphatidylinositol 4,5-bisphosphate (PIP_{2}) and calmodulin (CaM) ===
The influx of Ca^{2+} inside the cell triggers negative feedback mechanisms to suppress TRPV6 activity and prevent Ca^{2+} overload. TRPV6 channel activity is regulated by the intracellular level of phospholipid phosphatidylinositol 4,5-bisphosphate (PIP_{2}) and interactions with Ca^{2+}-Calmodulin (CaM) complex. The depletion of PIP_{2} or CaM-binding inactivates TRPV6. The influx of Ca^{2+} in TRPV6 expressing cells activates phospholipase C (PLC) which in turn hydrolyzes PIP_{2}. Depletion in PIP_{2} levels results in a decline in channel activity since most TRP channels require this lipid for activation. The lipid PIP_{2} can override Ca^{2+}-CaM-mediated inhibition of TRPV6. Overall, TRPV6 inactivation by calmodulin is orchestrated by a balance of intracellular Ca^{2+} and PIP_{2} concentration.

=== Interacting proteins ===
Among 20+ TRPV6 interactors identified so far, the functional consequences of Ca^{2+}-binding protein Calmodulin (CaM) and Glucuronidase Klotho have been most extensively characterized [36, 37, 41, 42]. Functional consequences of TRPV6 channel activation are summarized in the table below).

TRPV6 Interactors and their Functional Consequences
Interactor	Consequence
BSPRY	N/A
Calbindin-D_{28k}	N/A
Calmodulin	Inhibition
Cyclophilin B	Activation
FYN	PO_{4}lyation
I-MFA	N/A
Klotho	Activation, Glycosylation (Asn-357)
NHERF4	Activation
NIPSNAP1	Inhibition
NUMB	Inhibition
PTEN	N/A
PTP1B	DePO_{4}lyation (Tyr-161 and Tyr-162)
RAB11A	Activation, Increase in Plasma membrane level
RGS2	N/A
RYR1	N/A
S100A10	Activation, Increase in Plasma membrane level
SRC	PO_{4}lyation (Tyr-161, 162)
TRPC1	Retains in ER, Inhibition
TRPML3	N/A
TRPV5	Tetramer formation, New Channel creation

Abbreviations

Protein Interactor

BSPRY: B-Box and Spry Domain Containing Protein; FYN: Fyn Kinase Belonging Src Family of Kinases; I-MFA: Myo D Family Inhibitor; NHERF: Na Exchanger Regulatory Factor; NIPSNAP14-Nitrophenylphosphatase Domain and Non-Neuronal SNAP25-Like Protein Homolog 1; Numb: Drosophila mutation that removes most of the sensory neurons in the developing peripheral nervous system; PTP: Protein Tyrosine Phosphatase; Rab11a: Member RAS Oncogene Family; RGS2: Regulator Of G-Protein Signaling 2; RyR1: Ryanodine Receptor 1; TRPC1: Transient receptor potential canonical 1; TRPML3: Transient receptor potential Mucolipin-3.

== Physiological functions ==
The Ca^{2+}-selective channel proteins TRPV6 and TRPV5 cooperate to maintain calcium concentration in specific organs. TRPV6 functions as apical Ca^{2+} entry channels mediating transcellular transport of this ion in the intestine, placenta, and possibly some other exocrine organs. TRPV6 also plays important roles in maternal-fetal calcium transport, keratinocyte differentiation, and Ca^{2+} homeostasis in the endolymphatic system of the vestibular system, and maintenance of male fertility.

=== Ca^{2+} absorption in intestine ===
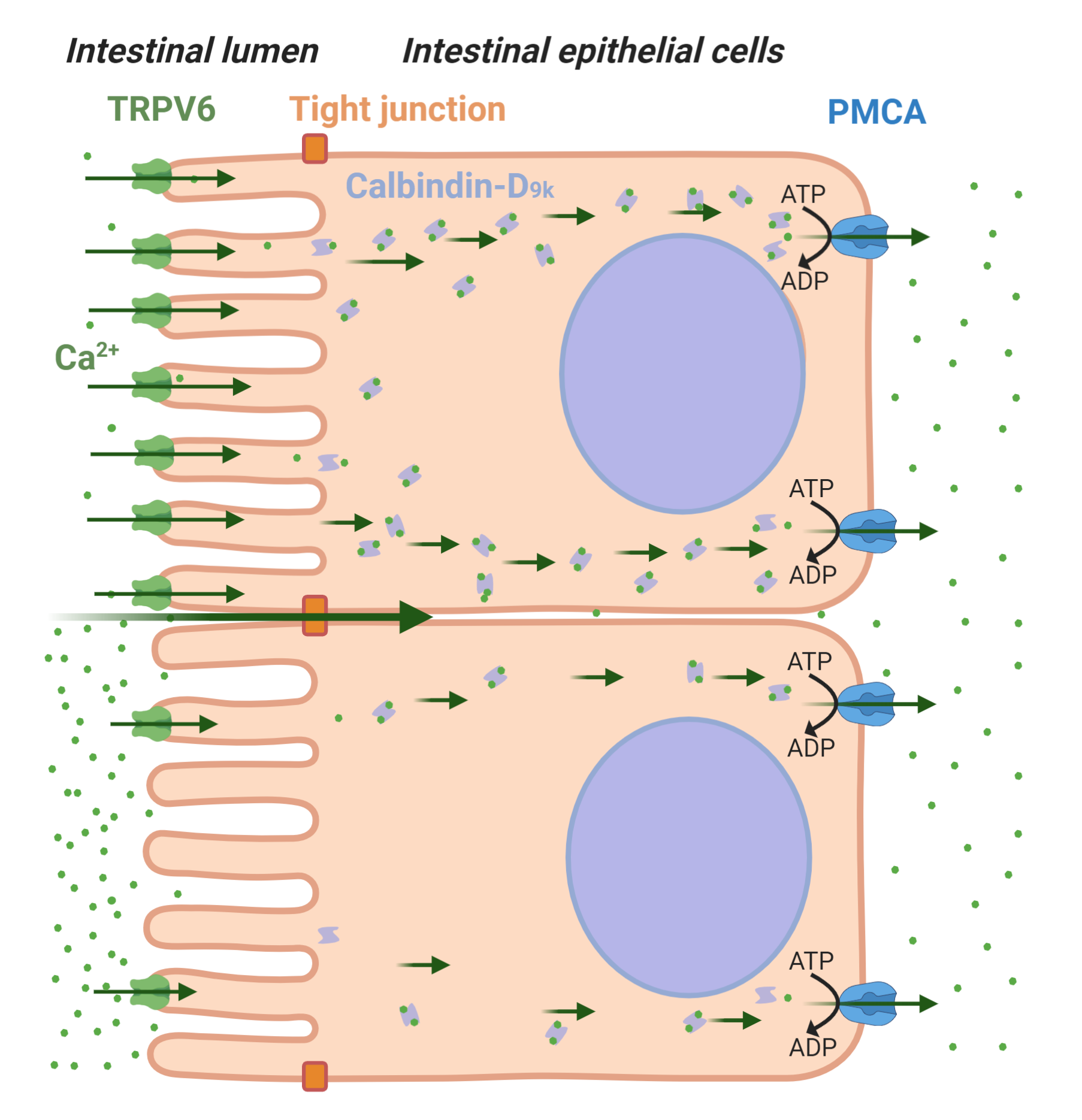
Figure 4. Role of TRPV6 in intestinal calcium absorption. TRPV6 mediates Ca^{2+} entry across the plasma membrane as the first step in the transcellular pathway of Ca^{2+} transport. This is considered the rate-limiting step in Ca^{2+} absorption by the enterocytes. The transcellular pathway enables the transport of Ca^{2+} against a [Ca^{2+}] gradient to ensure Ca^{2+} absorption when the luminal [Ca^{2+}] is lower than that in the blood side; The Ca^{2+} binding protein calbindin-D_{9k} and plasma membrane Ca^{2+} ATPase (PMCA) are known components in these transcellular pathways.

Two routes of Ca^{2+} absorption are recognized: paracellular transport and transcellular transport (see Figure 4). A high-Ca^{2+}-diet favors paracellular transport of the ion across the length of the intestine allowing them to pass between the intercellular tight junctions that connect epithelial cells. In contrast under conditions when [Ca^{2+}] in the lumen of the intestine is lower in comparison to its concentration in the plasma (e.g. during low dietary Ca^{2+}), the transcellular pathway is required for adequate Ca^{2+} absorption. Three important steps in transcellular Ca^{2+} transport are recognized: cellular entry of Ca^{2+} ion on the apical side via TRPV6 (Step-1), the binding of Ca^{2+} ion with calbindin-D_{9k} (Step-2)_{,} and exit of Ca^{2+} from the basolateral side via the plasma membrane Ca^{2+} ATPase (PMCA1b). The hormone vitamin D_{3} (or 1,25(OH)_{2}D_{3}) plays an important role in TRPV6-mediated intestinal Ca^{2+} absorption).

=== Ca^{2+} reabsorption in the kidney ===
In contrast to the intestine, where TRPV6 is the gatekeeper of Ca^{2+} absorption, the transcellular reabsorption of this ion in the kidney occurs through TRPV5. Although TRPV5 is a recognized gatekeeper for transcellular reabsorption of Ca^{2+} ion in the kidney, TRPV6 knockout (KO) mice also struggle to concentrate their urine and display hypercalciuria. TRPV6 is known to co-localize with TRPV5 Calbindin-D_{28K} in apical domains of distal convoluted tubules and connecting tubules [20]. TRPV5 KO mice compensate for Ca^{2+} loss by increasing TRPV6 expression in the duodenum. Moreover, a recent study analyzing vitamin D responsive genes in ovine, canine and, equine kidney suggested that TRPV6, calD_{9k}/calD_{28k}, and PMCA could be the main pathways orchestrating transcellular Ca^{2+} transport in the kidney of sheep, dogs, and horses.

=== Maternal-fetal Ca^{2+} transport ===
TRPV6 plays an indispensable role in placental Ca^{2+} transport. Fetal bone mineralization peaks during late pregnancy. At this stage, fetal blood has a higher concentration of Ca^{2+} in comparison to maternal blood thereby creating conditions that require active transcellular transport of Ca^{2+} from mother to the fetus. This process is very important since defects in placental transport of calcium can be precursors for Ca^{2+} deficiency syndromes and intrauterine growth restrictions. The expression of TRPV6 increases 14-fold during the last 4 days of the murine gestational period and coincides with the peak phase of fetal bone mineralization. The protein TRPV6 is abundantly expressed in the mammalian placental tissues. Indeed, TRPV6 expression is ~1000-fold higher in comparison to TRPV5. In the placenta, TRPV6 is expressed in trophoblasts and syncytiotrophoblasts. In mice, TRPV6 mRNA and protein are expressed in the intraplacental yolk sac and the visceral layer of the extraplacental yolk sac. Most importantly, TRPV6 KO fetuses exhibit a 40% reduction in ^{45}Ca^{2+} transport activity and a dramatic decrease in the ash weight (a measure of fetal bone health). In humans, trophoblasts fluid shear stress (FSS) is known to induce a TRPV6-mediated Ca^{2+} influx and promote microvilli formation through a mechanism involving Ezrin and Akt-phosphorylation.

=== Epididymal Ca^{2+} regulation and implications on male fertility ===
The regulation of calcium concentration in the epididymal lumen is critical for sperm motility. TRPV6-mediated reduction of luminal Ca^{2+} concentration in the epididymis is critical for male fertility in mice. TRPV6 KO mice or mice expressing loss-of-function version of TRPV6 channel (Trpv6^{D541A} homozygous mice) have a severely impaired fertility. Mice expressing nonfunctional TRPV6 have a 10-fold higher concentration of Ca^{2+} in the epididymal lumen and Ca^{2+} uptake in this space is reduced by 7-to-8 folds. The increases Ca^{2+} ion in epididymal lumen concentration leads to significant defects in motility, fertilization capacity, and viability of sperms in TRPV6^{D541A} mice. It appears TRPV6 and chloride channel transmembrane manner 16 A (TMEM16A) act cooperatively to reduce the luminal concentration of Ca^{2+} in the epididymal lumen.

=== Bone health ===
Under conditions of sub-optimal dietary Ca^{2+}, normal serum calcium levels in TRPV6 KO mice are maintained at the expense of bone. TRPV6 plays an important role in osteoclasts but not in osteoblasts. In mice, TRPV6 depletion results in increased osteoclasts differentiation whereas TRPV5 is essential for proper osteoclastic bone resorption.

=== Keratinocyte differentiation ===
Keratinocytes differentiation is orchestrated by calcium switch, a process that entails an influx of Ca^{2+} in keratinocyte which induces broad transcriptional changes necessary for desmosome formation, stratification, and cornification. TRPV6 KO mice display thinner layers of stratum corneum and 20% of the mice also show alopecia and dermatitis. The silencing of TRPV6 impairs Ca^{2+}-mediated differentiation of human primary keratinocytes and downregulates differentiation markers such as involucrin, transglutaminase-1, and cytokeratin-10. The hormone 1,25-dihydroxyvitamin-D3 upregulates TRPV6 in keratinocytes and triggers a Ca^{2+} influx. This in turn induces the expression of keratinocyte differentiation-specific pathways.

=== Role in the inner ear ===
The proteins TRPV5 and TRPV6 are expressed in several regions of the inner ear as well as in primary cultures of semicircular canal duct (SCCD) epithelium. Some studies have indicated that TRPV5 and TRPV6 are needed for lowering the Ca^{2+} concentration in the lumen of mammalian endolymph, a requirement that is essential for normal hearing and balance.

=== Uterine and placental expression of TRPV6 and implications in pregnancy ===
The endometrial and uterine expression of TRPV6 has been reported in mammals. The expression of TRPV6 in the uterus is thought to be hormonally regulated by 17β-estradiol and progesterone in rodents. In rodents, TRPV6 mRNA is expressed in the labyrinth and spongy zone as well as placenta-unattached areas of the uterus. The stage of pregnancy is an important regulator of TRPV6 expression. The downregulation of TRPV5/6 expression and a resulting decline in Ca^{2+} transport is thought to change the proliferative profile of human trophoblasts; a process which in turn is linked to the development of pre-eclampsia. This juxtaposition of TRPV6 expression and its stringent regulation by sex hormones during pregnancy suggest that the protein may be important for embryo implantation, however conclusive evidence for this connection does not exist.

== Clinical significance ==
=== Transient neonatal hyperparathyroidism ===
Loss of TRPV6 in murine placenta severely impairs Ca^{2+} transport across trophoblast and reduces embryo growth, induces bone calcification, and impairs bone development. In humans, the insufficient maternal-fetal transport caused by pathogenic genomic variants of TRPV6 is thought to be a cause for skeletal defects observed in selected case reports of transient neonatal hyperparathyroidism (TNHP) cases. These variants are believed to compromise the plasma membrane localization of the protein. Exome sequencing of an infant with severe antenatal onset thoracic insufficiency with accompanying fetal skeletal abnormalities indicates the critical role of TRPV6 in maternal-fetal transport. The study indicated that compound heterozygous variants of TRPV6 result in severe undermineralization and severe dysplasia of the fetal skeleton.

=== Chronic pancreatitis ===
Recent evidence indicates that naturally occurring TRPV6 loss of function variants predisposes certain demographics to chronic pancreatitis (CP) by dysregulating calcium homeostasis in the pancreatic cells. Sequencing studies among chronic pancreatitis patients revealed the presence of 33 missense and 2 nonsense variants predisposed Japanese, German, and French patients to a higher risk of CP. Overall, these studies have shown that disease-inducing TRPV6 loss-of-function genomic variants are over-represented in German, French, Chinese, and Japanese CP patients in comparison to controls in their respective groups. The loss-of-function variants are believed to compromise calcium transport in the pancreas by act by either reducing the total protein level and/or compromising Ca^{2+} uptake activity by the channel.

=== Kidney stone formation ===
The role of TRPV6 in renal stone formation has been suggested through sequencing studies conducted on a cohort of 170 patients in Switzerland. The studies revealed that the frequency of TRPV6 gain-of-function haplotype is significantly higher in Ca^{2+-}stone formers (nephrolithiasis) in comparison to non-formers. The observed hypercalciuria phenotypes from animal studies and studies on TRPV6 single nucleotide polymorphisms (SNPs) suggest that TRPV6 haplotype could be an important risk factor for absorptive and renal hypercalciuria (kidney stones due to impaired intestinal absorption and renal re-absorption respectively). The lower incidence of kidney stone diseases in African-Americans and a relatively higher prevalence of ancestral haplotype suggest theory according to which this haplotype endows an advantage of increased Ca^{2+} reabsorption in this demographic and reduces the incidence of kidney stones.

=== Bone resorptive diseases ===
TRPV6 KO mice exhibit osteoporosis-like symptoms such as reduced bone mineral density and hypercalciuria. The hormone estrogen, the deficiency of which is linked to post-menopausal osteoporosis, also regulates the expression of TRPV6 in humans. Indeed, a lower calcium absorption seen in older postmenopausal women is attributed to reduced TRPV6. The C-terminal portion of Soricidin is a drug that inhibits Ca^{2+}-uptake activity by binding to TRPV6. Preclinical studies of this drug have shown great promise in the treatment of bone resorptive diseases.

The high degree of similarity between Hereditary Vitamin D–Resistant Rickets (HVDRR) disease symptoms and observed phenotypes in TRPV6 KO mice has led some experts to postulate pathological connections between the disease and TRPV6 dysfunction. TRPV6 plays an important chondroprotective role by regulating multiple aspects of chondrocyte function, such as extracellular matrix secretion, the release of matrix-degrading enzymes, cell proliferation, and apoptosis. Furthermore, TRPV6 knockout mice display multiple osteoarthritis (OA) phenotypes such as cartilage fibrillation, eburnation, and loss of proteoglycans.

=== Pendred syndrome ===
The dysfunction gene Slc26a4 has been linked to Pendred syndrome – a genetic disorder that results in syndromic deafness in children. The disease is caused by mutations in which compromise the function of the encoded protein pendrin – an anion Cl^{−}/HCO3 ^{−} exchanger expressed in the inner ear. The loss of function in this gene is thought to reduce the pH value of mammalian endolymph and impair Ca^{2+} absorption via TRPV5 and TRPV6. This in turn could prevent the uptake of Ca^{2+} and impairs the luminal reduction in Ca^{2+} concentration within the endolymphatic system of the ear.

=== Cancer ===
The overexpression of TRPV6 has been validated in the colon, parathyroid, pancreatic, and thyroid cancer whereas its expression is reportedly downregulated in esophageal cancer, non-small cell lung cancer, and renal cancer. TRPV6 is considered to be an oncochannel that is hypothesized to mediate cancer progression by triggering Ca^{2+}-entry induced aberrations in molecular drivers regulating processes such as cell cycle, apoptosis, and migration; thereby conferring proliferative and survival advantages to cancer cells. Overexpression of TRPV6 correlates strongly with pathological stage, tumor grade, extra-prostatic invasion, lymph node metastasis, and resistance to androgen-targeted therapies in prostate cancer. The expression TRPV6 has been touted as a prognostic marker for advanced prostate cancer since its expression is strongly dependent on the grade of the tumor. Expression of TRPV6 is significantly elevated in breast adenocarcinoma tissue in comparison to normal breast tissue. TRPV6 expression has been reported multiple breast cancer cell lines and prostate cancer cell lines. The prostate cancer cell lines PC-3 and LnCAP overexpress TRPV6 relative to benign epithelial cells PrEC and BPH-1. The silencing of TRPV6 in prostate cancer cells decreases proliferation rate, S-phase accumulation, and expression of tumor marker proliferating cell nuclear antigen (PCNA) expression. TRPV6 overexpression is believed to induce aberrant Ca^{2+-}uptake in prostate cancer line and activate transcription factor Nuclear Factor of Activated T cells (NFAT).

Expression of TRPV6 is upregulated by estrogen, progesterone, and estradiol in breast cancer cell line T47D. In agreement with these observations, the estrogen receptor antagonist Tamoxifen reduces TRPV6 expression in T47D cells and suppresses Ca^{2+}-uptake of the channel in both ER-positive and ER-negative breast cancer cell lines. The overexpression of TRPV6 is associated with early-stage colon cancer and its silencing in colon cancer induces apoptosis and inhibits cancer cell proliferation. In terms of mechanism, mutations within the calmodulin-binding domains of TRPV6 channels confers invasive properties to colon adenocarcinoma cells. The proteins p38α and GADD45α are believed to upregulate TRPV6 expression signaling in SW480 colon cancer cells by enhancing vitamin D signaling. TRPV6 has been reported to amplify Insulin-like growth factors (IGF)-induced PI3K-PDK1-Akt signaling in human colon cancer and promote colon cancer.

TRPV6 is up-regulated in primary cancer tissues from pancreatic cancer patients and promotes the proliferation of pancreatic neuroendocrine tumors NFAT-dependent mechanisms. Silencing of TRPV6 induces apoptosis and cell cycle arrest in pancreatic cancer cells and inhibits their invasion, proliferation, and migration. Forced expression of TRPV6 in gastric cancer cells increases their sensitivity to capsaicin-induced apoptosis whereas the siRNA-mediated silencing of the channel suppresses this sensitivity. TRPV6 downregulation in esophageal carcinoma has been suggested to be a prognostic marker of disease-specific survival in patients suffering from esophageal cancer. Low TRPV5 and TRPV6 co-expression have suggested as predictive markers for poor recurrence-free survival in non-small cell lung cancer.

== Pharmacological targeting ==
Several chemical inhibitors are known to inhibit TRPV6. Some compounds that have demonstrated inhibitory activity towards TRPV6 include TH-1177, 2-Aminoethoxydiphenyl borate (2-APB), 2-APB derivative 22b, Econazole, Miconazole, Piperazine derivative Cis-22a, Capsaicin, Δ^{9}-tetrahydrocannabivarin, Xestospongin C, Lidocaine, gold-caged nanoparticle (PTX-PP@Au NPs) and Sorcidin C-13 (SOR-C13) synthetic peptide. Among different inhibition strategies tested so far, the 13-amino acid peptide SOR-C13 has shown the most promise. This 13-amino acid peptide derived from 54-amino acid peptide found in the paralytic venom of the northern short-tailed shrew (Blarina brevicauda) reduces cancer growth in cell and animal models. This anti-cancer agent has recently completed a Phase I clinical safety trial that had enrolled 23 patients with advanced solid tumors of epithelial origin non-responsive to all standard-of-care treatments.

== Regulation ==
The regulation of TRPV6 can be examined mainly in the context of its physiological, hormonal, and molecular factors. The hormonal regulation of TRPV6 has been characterized most extensively. In this regard, its regulation by the hormone vitamin D_{3} and sex hormones has been examined in considerable detail. Rodent studies suggest that the TRPV6 channel is regulated by a wide range of physiological factors such as diet, age, gender, pregnancy, lactation, sex hormones, exercise, age, and gender. Some biological and pharmacological agents known to regulate TRPV6 include glucocorticoids, immunosuppressive drugs, and diuretics.

=== Vitamin D ===
Multiple dose-response and time-course experiments in rodents and colon cancer cell lines have conclusively shown TRPV6 mRNA is robustly induced by this vitamin D at extremely low concentrations. At least five vitamin D response elements (VDREs) at positions −1.2, −2.1, −3.5, −4.3, and −5.5 kb relative to transcriptional start site (TSS) have been identified on TRPV6 transcripts. Among these five sites, VDREs at positions −1.2, −2.1, and −4.3 kb are significantly more responsive to 1,25-(OH)_{2}D_{3} in comparison to VDREs located at −3.5 and −5.5 kb which do not appear to contribute substantially to vitamin D mediated transcriptional regulation in the intestine. Mechanism wise, TRPV6 transcription is initiated in response to vitamin D receptor (VDR)-mediated signaling, although other non-direct mechanisms cannot be ruled out. Important steps in vitamin D mediated transcriptional regulation include 1) binding of vitamin D on its cognate vitamin D receptor (VDR), 2) the translocation of vitamin D receptor (VDR)–retinoid X receptor heterodimer complex in the nucleus, 3) binding VDR-RXR complex on the TRPV6 gene promoter, 4) recruitment of steroid receptor coactivator 1 and RNA polymerase II on the promoter, and 5) transcriptional activation mediated through histone H4 acetylation events.

=== Diet ===
The level of Ca^{2+} and vitamin D in the diet are the most important regulators of TRPV6 expression. The expression of TRPV6 is thought to be modulated strongly to fine-tune Ca^{2+} absorption from the diet, especially under conditions when dietary Ca^{2+} availability is low. In rodents, restricting Ca^{2+} availability in the diet induces dramatic up-regulation in the duodenal expression of TRPV6. Calcium influx from the diet and its subsequent binding to calbindin-D_{9k} could be the rate-limiting step that modulates vitamin D-dependent regulation TRPV6. When dietary Ca^{2+} is insufficient, normal blood calcium levels in TRPV6 KO mice are maintained at the expense of bone. In many rodent lines, genetic variations in TRPV6, calbindin-D_{9k}, PMCA1b mRNA influence intestinal Ca absorption and its impact on bone marrow density.

=== Pregnancy and lactation ===
Duodenal expression of TRPV6 transcripts is upregulated in WT and VDR KO mice during pregnancy and lactation. The hormone prolactin upregulates TRPV6 transcription and facilitates an increase in intestinal Ca^{2+} absorption in lactating and pregnant rats, possibly as an adaptive mechanism for overcoming the loss in bone mineralization content during lactation.

=== Aging ===
The intestinal expression of TRPV6 in mice varies dramatically by age and relative tissue location. The duodenal expression of TRPV6 is undetectable at P1 and increases 6-fold as mice age to P14. Similarly, the expression also varies with age in the jejunum, where TRPV6 levels increases from P1 to P14, become weak at 1-month age and becomes undetectable in older mice. The expression of TRPV6 in older rats (12-months) is at least 50% lower in comparison to younger counterparts (2-months old). In both WT and VDR KO mice, the age-associated decline in intestinal absorption of Ca^{2+} is accompanied by a decline in duodenal expression of TRPV6.

=== Sex hormones ===
Sex hormones play an important role in the regulation of TRPV6. In comparison to male mice, female mice exhibit a 2-fold higher increase in duodenal expression of TRPV6 mRNA following vitamin D treatment. Sex hormone-associated differential regulation of TRPV6 across genders is believed to be correlated to differences in relative risk to osteoporosis in older postmenopausal women which have been reported to have lower TRPV6 and VDR expression in comparison to males.

Estrogen treatment upregulates TRPV6 transcripts by 8-fold in VDR KO mice and by 4-fold in ovariectomized mice. Greater than 50% reduction in TRPV6 mRNA has been observed in estrogen receptor α KO mice. It is believed that estrogen could be differentially regulating Ca^{2+} absorption in the duodenum by increasing TRPV6 expression through ERα. Anti-progesterone agent RU486 and anti-estrogen agent ICI 182,780 suppress TRPV6 expression in rodents by their respective antagonist action on progesterone and estrogen receptors. Estrogen, progesterone, and dexamethasone are known to upregulate TRPV6 expression in the cerebral cortex and hypothalamus of mice suggesting a potential involvement of TRPV6 in calcium absorption in the brain.

=== Glucocorticoids ===
Subcutaneous administration of glucocorticoids dexamethasone induces both renal and intestinal expression of TRPV6 in mice within 24 hours of whereas oral application of prednisolone reduction in TRPV6 which is also accompanied by reduced Ca^{2+} absorption in duodenum. Intestinal regulation of TRPV6 in response to glucocorticoids appears to be VDR-dependent. The enzyme serum and glucocorticoid-regulated kinase 1 (SKG1) regulates TRPV6 expression by enhancing phosphatidylinositol-3-phosphate-5-kinase PIKfyve (PIP5K3). This kinase is critical for the generation of secondary messenger PIP_{2}, a known lipid activator of TRPV6.

- TRPV
- TRPV5
- calcium channels
- calcium absorption
- transcellular pathway
- gating mechanism
- calmodulin
- maternal-fetal transport
- transient neonatal hyperparathyroidism
- chronic pancreatitis
- kidney stones
- cancer
