= Efruxifermin =

Experimental drug

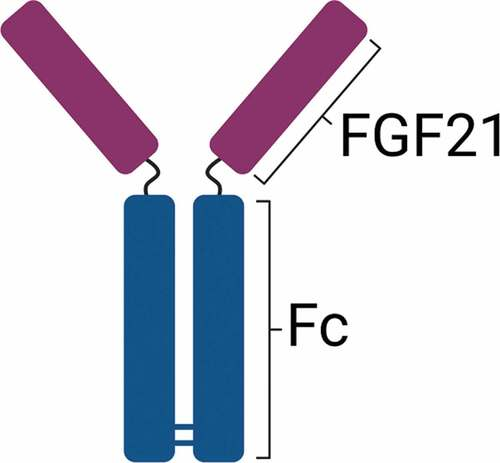

Clinical data
- Other names: AKR-001; AMG-876

Legal status
- Legal status: Investigational

Identifiers
- CAS Number: 2375240-92-7
- PubChem SID: 472421610
- DrugBank: DB19012
- UNII: C1KR8TZ3NE
- KEGG: D11868
- ChEMBL: ChEMBL4594389

Efruxifermin (AKR-001) is an investigational drug developed by Akero Therapeutics, acting as a fibroblast growth factor 21 (FGF21) analog developed to treat metabolic dysfunction-associated steatohepatitis (MASH), formerly known as non-alcoholic steatohepatitis (NASH), and type 2 diabetes.

Efruxifermin is designed to mimic the biological activity of FGF21, which is a metabolic hormone, primarily produced and secreted by hepatocytes in response to metabolic stressors such as fasting, ketogenic diets, or high carbohydrate intake. Its dysfunction is a key contributor to MASH. FGF21 acts to regulate systemic energy balance, glucose metabolism, and lipid oxidation. It does so by binding to specific fibroblast growth factor receptors (FGFRs)—primarily FGFR1c, FGFR2c, and FGFR3c. However, FGFRs alone have low specificity and affinity for FGF21. They require transmembrane protein β-klotho (KLB) as a co-receptor to enable effective signaling. Efruxifermin acts as an agonist of FGFR1c, FGFR2c, and FGFR3c, with co-activation requiring the presence of KLB, which is consistent with the biological activity of FGF21.

As of beginning of 2025, efruxifermin is undergoing Phase 3 clinical trials in the SYNCHRONY program, which includes studies targeting both pre-cirrhotic MASH and compensated cirrhosis due to MASH. The SYNCHRONY program builds on results from two 96-week Phase 2b clinical trials, where 39-41% of patients receiving the drug experienced at least a one-stage improvement in fibrosis without worsening of MASH, compared to 15-20% in the placebo group.
