= S100A10 =

Protein found in humans

Identifiers
- Aliases: S100A10, 42C, ANX2L, ANX2LG, CAL1L, CLP11, Ca[1], GP11, P11, p10, S100 calcium binding protein A10
- External IDs: OMIM: 114085; MGI: 1339468; GeneCards: S100A10
Available structures
PDB	Ortholog search: PDBe RCSB
PDB	List of PDB id codes 1A4P, 1BT6, 4DRW, 4FTG, 4HRE, 4HRG, 4HRH

Gene location (Human)
Chr.	Chromosome 1 (human)
Band	1q21.3	Start	151,982,915 bp
Band	1q21.3	End	151,993,859 bp

Gene location (Mouse)
Chr.	Chromosome 3 (mouse)
Band	3 F2.1|3 40.51 cM	Start	93,462,387 bp
Band	3 F2.1|3 40.51 cM	End	93,471,950 bp
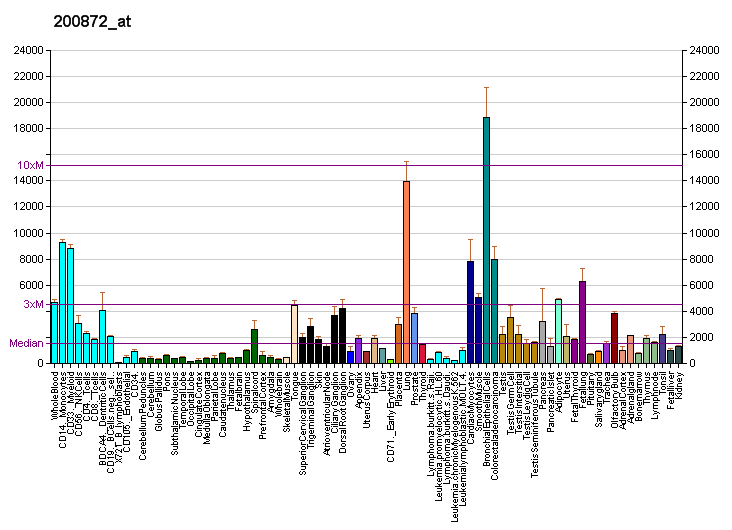
RNA expression pattern
Bgee	Human / Mouse (ortholog); Top expressed in: mucosa of sigmoid colon; spinal ganglia; synovial joint; germinal epithelium; cartilage tissue; synovial membrane; mucosa of pharynx; trigeminal ganglion; amniotic fluid; oral cavity / Top expressed in: conjunctival fornix; endothelial cell of lymphatic vessel; external carotid artery; umbilical cord; cornea; gastrula; internal carotid artery; aortic valve; ascending aorta; efferent ductule; More reference expression data
BioGPS	More reference expression data
Gene ontology
Molecular function	calcium ion binding; protein binding; protein homodimerization activity; transmembrane transporter binding; lipid binding
Cellular component	membrane raft; extrinsic component of plasma membrane; extracellular exosome; endoplasmic reticulum; extracellular region; collagen-containing extracellular matrix
Biological process	positive regulation of focal adhesion assembly; positive regulation of GTPase activity; positive regulation of substrate adhesion-dependent cell spreading; positive regulation of binding; protein heterotetramerization; membrane raft assembly; vesicle budding from membrane; positive regulation of stress fiber assembly; protein localization to plasma membrane
Sources:Amigo / QuickGO
Orthologs
Databases	NCBI: entry; OMA: entry
Species	Human	Mouse
Entrez	6281	20194
Ensembl	ENSG00000197747	ENSMUSG00000041959
UniProt	P60903	P08207
RefSeq (mRNA)	NM_002966	NM_009112
RefSeq (protein)	NP_002957	NP_033138
Location (UCSC)	Chr 1: 151.98 – 151.99 Mb	Chr 3: 93.46 – 93.47 Mb
PubMed search
- Wikidata
View/Edit Human	View/Edit Mouse

S100 calcium-binding protein A10 (S100A10), also known as p11, is a protein that is encoded by the S100A10 gene in humans and the S100a10 gene in other species. S100A10 is a member of the S100 family of proteins containing two EF-hand calcium-binding motifs. S100 proteins are localized in the cytoplasm and/or nucleus of a wide range of cells. They regulate a number of cellular processes such as cell cycle progression and differentiation. The S100 protein is implicated in exocytosis and endocytosis by reorganization of F-actin.

The p11 protein is linked with the transport of neurotransmitters. Found in the brain of humans and other mammals, it has been implicated in the regulation of mood. In addition, due to its interaction with serotonin-signaling proteins and its correlation with symptoms of mood disorders, p11 is a new potential target for drug therapy.

== Gene ==
The S100 gene family, localized in the cytoplasm and nucleus of cells, includes at least 13 members that are located as a cluster on chromosome 1q21. In humans, 19 family members are currently known, with most S100 genes (S100A1 to S100A16). Proteins in the S100 gene family are known to regulate a number of cellular processes, such as cell cycle progression and differentiation.

== Structure ==
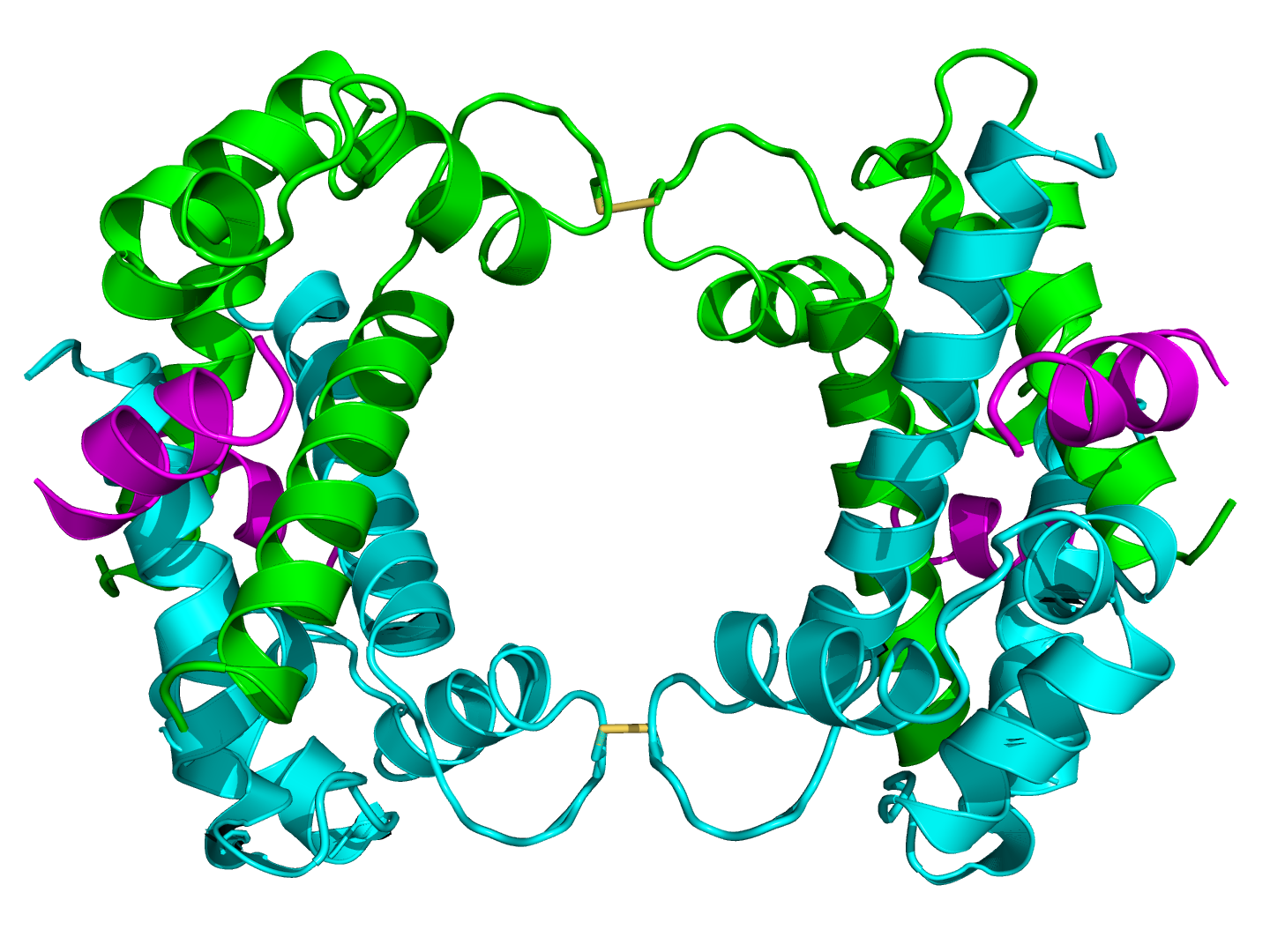
The crystallographic structure of p11 protein tetramer. Disulfide bonds between the pair of dimers (cyan and green) is represented by yellow sticks. The N-terminus of annexin II is magenta colored.

The p11 protein can be found as a free monomer, a homodimer, or a heterotetramer composed of a p11 dimer complex with two molecules of annexin II. The homodimer or heterotetramer can, in turn, dimerize through formation of two disulfide bonds (see figure to the left). The p11 monomer is an asymmetric protein composed of four alpha helices. The dimerized form of the protein is created by packing between the H1 and H4 helices in an antiparallel arrangement with the hydrophobic regions residing in the core.

The structure of p11 is classified by a pair of the helix-loop-helix motif, also known as the EF-hand-type that recognizes and binds calcium ions. This is common to all known S-100 proteins. The EF-hand types, united by an anti-parallel beta-strand between loops L1 and L3, are located on the same side of the molecule, opposite the N-and C-termini. As a member of the S-100 family, its structure resembles that of the S-100A1 and S-100B proteins. This class of proteins has been implicated in the regulation of cytoskeleton assembly, cytosolic enzymes, and membrane dynamics.

P11's involvement with the cytoskeleton may aid the transport of other proteins throughout the cell and to the cell membrane. Unlike other S-100 proteins, the second EF-hand of protein p11 is incapable of binding calcium due to a series of mutations caused by deletions and substitutions. Annexin II, which is attracted to negatively charged phospholipids, binds to p11 at the Ca^{2+} binding site. In addition, Annexin II has been implicated in membrane-cytoskeleton interactions and in regulations of ion currents and substances across the membrane. P11 and annexin II form a heterotetrameric protein complex that imitates the structure and function of S-100 proteins activated by the binding of calcium. This tetrameric complex is more stable than the p11 dimer, therefore the overexpression of the annexin II gene results in higher levels of p11 protein.

== Function ==
P11 is an integral part of cellular structural scaffolding that interacts with plasma membrane proteins through its association with annexin II. Recently, it was discovered to form a complex with annexin I though the mechanism remains unknown. It works together with cytosolic and peripheral membrane-associated proteins such as AHNAK in the development of the intracellular membrane. P11 has been implicated in the transportation of proteins involved in mood regulation, nociception, and cell polarization. It is found in cell types throughout the body though it is located predominantly in the lungs and kidneys. It is involved in the trafficking of proteins to the plasma membrane and can be expressed on the cell surface as a receptor. Many of the transported proteins are cell surface receptors in signal transduction pathways and ion channels. P11 facilitates nociception, Ca^{2+} uptake, and cell polarization. Complexed with the annexin II, p11 binds receptor and channel proteins and guides them to the cell surface, resulting in increased membrane localization and consequent magnified functional expression of these proteins.

Ion channels are among the several proteins that are transported through the interaction with p11. Some of these proteins include Na_{v}1.8, TRPV5, TRPV6, TASK-1, and ASIC1a. Na_{v}1.8 is a tetrodotoxin-resistant sodium channel that replaces lost sodium after cell damage. Increased expression of these channels alters the magnitude of the sodium current across the membrane. TRPV5 and TRPV6 are transient receptor potential channels selective for Ca^{+} and Mg^{2+} ions. TASK-1 is a two-pore domain K^{+} channel TWIK-related acid-sensitive K (TASK). P11 can also function as a retention factor, preventing TASK-1 from leaving the endoplasmic reticulum. ASIC1a is an acid-sensing ion channel involved in the pain sensory pathway, which is regulated by p11.

Although the exact mechanism is unclear, p11 protein has shown to be essential in the regulation of serotonin signaling in the brain. Serotonin (5-hydroxytryptamine or 5-HT), is a neurotransmitter found in the central and peripheral nervous systems. It is involved in mechanisms responsible for memory formation and learning, but is most known for its role in the regulation of muscle contraction, appetite, sleep, and mood. Varying levels of serotonin found in the brain are associated with the development of mood disorders, such as clinical depression. P11 interacts with the serotonin receptor proteins, 5-HT receptors such as 5-HT_{1B}, a receptor involved in the physiological effect of locomotor behavior, satiety, sleep, sexual behavior, body temperature regulation, and regulation of learning and memory processes, modulating the receptor signal transduction pathways activated by the binding of serotonin. P11 also recruits the cell surface expression of the 5-HT_{4} receptor, increasing its concentration at the synapse. This results in more rapid serotonin-dependent activities. 5-HT_{4} is involved in the regulation of kinase activity in the central nervous system, phosphorylating target proteins, and facilitating endosomal activities. P11 is coexpressed with 5-HT_{4} mRNA and its protein in parts of the brain associated with depression, suggesting that their functions are linked and influence mood.

Protein p11 can also be presented on the cell surface as a receptor for tissue-type plasminogen activator (tPA) and plasminogen. Plasmin production by many cells is dependent on p11.

== Interactions ==
S100A10 has been shown to interact with TRPV5, TRPV6, TASK-1, ASIC1a, CTSB, BAD, KCNK3, UBC and ANXA2.

There is a specificity in the interaction between p11 and 5-HT_{1B}. In a two-hybrid screen using twenty six out of 29 double-positive prey clones containing the gene encoding p11. This study showed that p11 interacted with 5-HT_{1B} receptors but not with 5-HT_{1A}, 5-HT_{2A}, 5-HT_{5A}, 5-HT_{6}, dopamine D_{1} or D_{2} receptors, two irrelevant baits (C{Delta}115 and pRP21), or the empty plasmid. The specific interaction has been verified in three other ways: In HeLa cells and brain tissue p11 was found to coimmunoprecipitate with 5-HT_{1B} receptors; Immunofluorescence studies show colocalization between p11 and 5-HT_{1B} receptors at the cell surface; and distribution of p11 mRNA in the brain resembles that of 5-HT_{1B} receptor mRNA. The table below shows the proteins that interact with p11 and the functional role of p11 in these interactions

=== Table 1 ===
Interactor	Biological function of P11	Reference
Annexin 2	Regulation of endosomal functions	
5-HT1B receptor	Localization of 5-HT1B receptors at the cell surface	
NaV1.8 sodium channel	Increase of NaV1.8 channels at the plasma membrane	
TASK-1 potassium channel	Regulation of TASK-1 channels at the plasma membrane	
ASIC-1 channels	Increase of ASIC channels at the plasma membrane	
TRPV5/TRPV6 channels	Increase of TRPV5/TRPV6 channels at the plasma membrane	
NS3	Mediation of virus release	
Cytosolic phospholipase A2	Reduced arachidonic acid release	
BAD	Inhibition of pro-apoptotic effect	
HPV16 L2	Facilitates binding and entry of human papillomavirus type 16	

== Regulation ==
=== Regulation of protein activity ===
The p11 and annexin II complex is regulated by the phosphorylation of SerII on the annexin II molecule by protein kinase C (PKC). This phosphorylation hinders the complex's ability to bind to certain target molecules. Protein kinase A (PKA) reverses the effects of PKC by activating a phosphatase, which reactivates the complex through dephosphorylation. The p11 protein can also undergo ubiquitin-independent proteasomal degradation in response to all-trans retinoic acid (ATRA).

=== Regulation of transcription ===
Current experiments on animals have shown that various factors and physiological stimuli have been successful in regulating the levels of p11 protein transcription. Some of these factors are shown in the table below.

==== Table 2 ====
Factor	Biological system	Reference
Dexamethasone	BEAS and HeLa cells	
Transforming growth factor-α	RGM-1 cells	
Epidermal growth factor	depolarization BEAS and HeLa cells	
Nitric Oxide donors	BEAS and HeLa cells	
Interferon-gamma	BEAS cells	
Vitamin D	mouse kidney	
Retinoic acid	BEAS cells	
nerve growth factor	PC12 cells, rat dorsal root ganglion	
imipramine	mouse frontal cortex	
tranylcypromine	mouse frontal cortex	
Electroconvulsive treatment	rat frontal cortex	
Sciatic nerve lesion	rat	
Experimental autoimmune encephalomyelitis	rat cerebellum	

== Clinical significance ==
=== Depression ===
Depression is a widespread, debilitating disease affecting persons of all ages and backgrounds. Depression is characterized by a plethora of emotional and physiological symptoms including feelings of sadness, hopelessness, pessimism, guilt, a general loss of interest in life, and a sense of reduced emotional well-being or low energy. Very little is known about the underlying pathophysiology of clinical depression and other related mood-disorders including anxiety, bipolar disorder, ADD, ADHD, and schizophrenia.

The p11 protein has been intimately linked to mood disorders, to be specific, depression, due to its role in serotonin systems via its interactions with serotonin 5-HT receptors. Serotonin affects diverse systems including the cardiovascular, renal, immune, and gastrointestinal systems. Current research focuses on the neurotransmitter's relationship with mood-regulation.

Under experimentation, mice deficient in the p11 protein display depression-like behaviors. Knockout experiments in which the gene coding for protein p11 was deleted from the mouse genome caused them to show signs of depression. This is also observed in humans. On the other hand, those with sufficient amount of p11 protein behave normally. When mice that showed depressive symptoms were administered anti-depressant drugs, their levels of p11 were found to increase at the same rate, as antidepressants affected their behavioral changes. In addition, post-mortem comparisons of brain tissues showed much lower levels of p11 in depressed compared to control subjects. Levels of p11 have been found to be substantially lower in depressed humans and helpless mice, which suggests that altered p11 levels may be involved in the development of depression-like symptoms.

=== Treatment ===
Most of the current drugs and treatments for depression and anxiety increase levels of serotonin transmission among neurons. Selective Serotonin Reuptake Inhibitors (SSRIs), a very successful class of drugs, are known to increase the amount of serotonin available to brain cells quite rapidly. Despite this, their therapeutic effects take a period of several weeks to months. Recent studies show that protein p11 increases the concentration of the serotonin 5-HT receptors at neuronal synapses, thereby rendering serotonin signaling much more efficient. The interaction with the serotonin 1b receptor (5-HT_{1B}) and p11 can be summarized as follows: When p11 levels increases, the number of 5-HT_{1B} receptors on the cell surface increase proportionately. An increase in the number of 5-HT_{1B} receptors on the surface of the neuron increase the effectiveness of serotonin communication across the synapse. On the other hand, when p11 levels decrease, fewer 5-HT_{1B} receptors migrate from inside the neuron to the cell membrane at the synaptic cleft, thus lowering the efficiency with which serotonin signaling can occur across the synapse. These findings suggest that, although the serotonin levels are immediately introduced via medication, the period of time within which the medicine alleviates the patient's depression most likely relies on other regulatory proteins. Thus, given protein p11's interaction with serotonin 5-HT receptors and the increasing evidence of the protein's correlation to mood disorders, this protein has been identified as a target for research in the development of future antidepressants.

Treatment with antidepressants (a tricyclic and monoamine oxidase inhibitor) and electroconvulsive therapy (ECT) caused an increase in the amount of p11 in the brain of these mice - the same biochemical change. The levels of the p11 protein in humans and mice with symptoms of depression were substantially lower in comparison to the levels of p11 in non-depressed animals. Leading researcher Paul Greengard and his colleagues hypothesized that increasing p11 levels would result in the mice exhibiting antidepressant-like behaviors, and the opposite if p11 protein levels were reduced. They used a test that is used to measure antidepressant-like activity to affirm this hypothesis. In their findings, over-expressed p11 genes, compared to the control mice, had increased mobility and more 5-HT_{1B} receptors at the cell surface, which made possible more serotonin transmission. When researchers "knocked out" the p11 gene in mice, they found that the knockout mice had fewer receptors at the cell surface, reduced serotonin signaling, reduced responsiveness to sweet reward, and decreased mobility, behaviors all characteristic of depression-like behaviors. Also, the 5-HT_{1B} receptors of p11 knockout mice were less responsive to serotonin and antidepressant drugs compared to those of control mice, which further implicates p11 in the main action of antidepressant medications. Antidepressant manipulations increase the p11 levels, whereas depressant manipulations reduce it. Therefore, in order to achieve an anti-depression effect, antidepressant medications should focus on the main action of the p11 proteins and increase levels of the protein.

=== Future clinical trials ===
At the current time, a study by the National Institutes of Health Clinical Center (CC) is recruiting participants for a study that will compare levels of p11 protein in people with and without major depressive disorder (MDD) and determine whether p11 levels in patients are affected by treatment with citalopram (Celexa), a serotonin reuptake inhibitor. If successful, a more personalized treatment of MDD will be available in the future.
