= TRPV3-74a =

Chemical compound

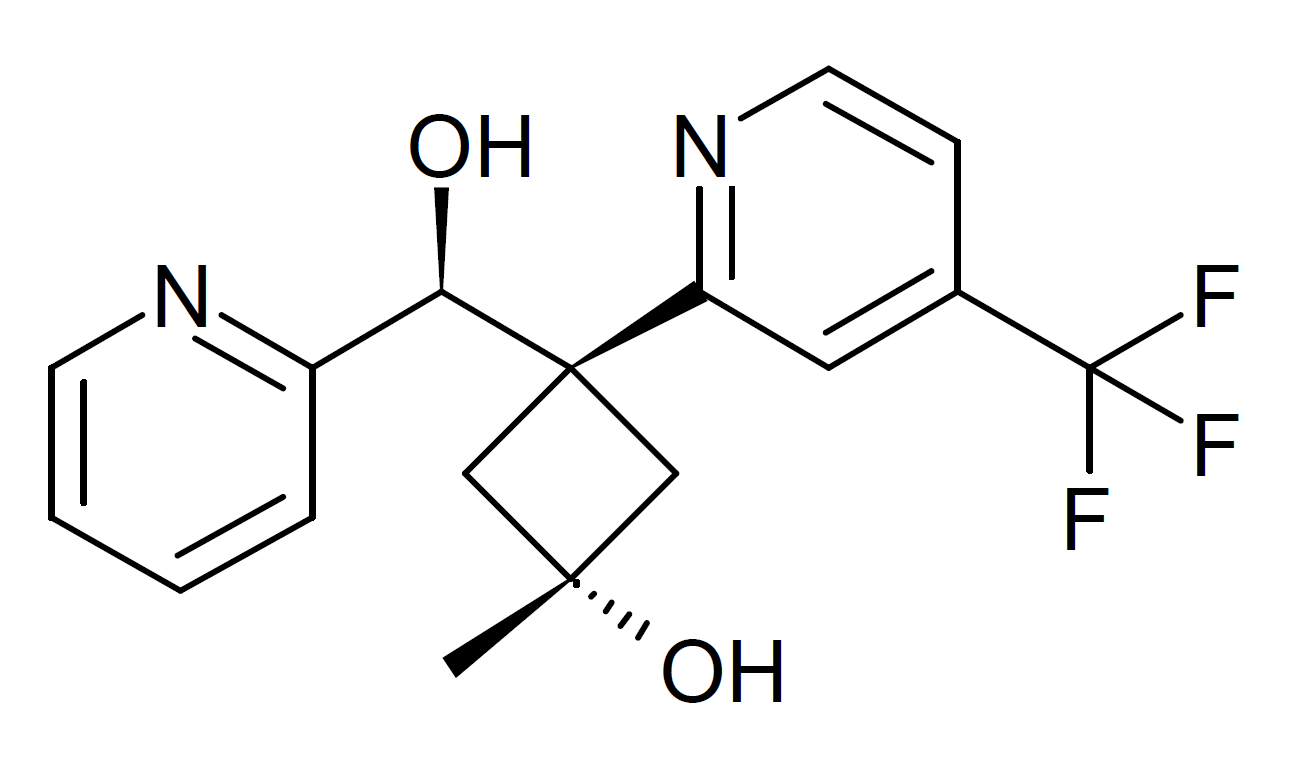

Identifiers
- IUPAC name: 3-[(S)-hydroxy(pyridin-2-yl)methyl]-1-methyl-3-[4-(trifluoromethyl)pyridin-2-yl]cyclobutan-1-ol
- CAS Number: 1432051-63-2
- PubChem CID: 71554840
- ChemSpider: 58922619
- ChEMBL: ChEMBL3828340

Chemical and physical data
- Formula: C_{17}H_{17}F_{3}N_{2}O_{2}
- Molar mass: 338.330 g·mol^{−1}
- 3D model (JSmol): Interactive image
- SMILES: C[C@]1(C[C@@]([C@@H](C2=CC=CC=N2)O)(C3=CC(C(F)(F)F)=CC=N3)C1)O
- InChI: InChI=1S/C17H17F3N2O2/c1-15(24)9-16(10-15,14(23)12-4-2-3-6-21-12)13-8-11(5-7-22-13)17(18,19)20/h2-8,14,23-24H,9-10H2,1H3/t14-,15?,16?/m1/s1; Key:MTJXDHFAWXGXIN-QQFBHYJXSA-N

TRPV3-74a is a drug which acts as a selective antagonist for the TRPV3 calcium channel. It has analgesic effects in animal studies against both neuropathic pain and normal pain responses.
