= Soricidin =

Soricidin is a paralytic oligopeptide found in the venomous saliva of the northern short-tailed shrew (Blarina brevicauda); in the wild, shrews use it to paralyze their prey (typically insects). Its name is a reference to "Soricidae", the family to which shrews belong.

In addition to blocking transmission of nerve impulses by inhibiting sodium channels, soricidin also inhibits the TRPV6 calcium channel, which is over-expressed in many epithelial-cell cancers; as a result, soricidin is able to selectively induce apoptosis in breast, ovarian, and prostate cancer.

It is 54 amino acids long. It was first extracted and identified in 2000, as a result of basic research by Jack Stewart of Mount Allison University.
