= TRPV5 =

Protein-coding gene in humans

Identifiers
- Aliases: TRPV5, CAT2, ECAC1, OTRPC3, transient receptor potential cation channel subfamily V member 5
- External IDs: OMIM: 606679; MGI: 2429764; GeneCards: TRPV5

Gene location (Human)
Chr.	Chromosome 7 (human)
Band	7q34	Start	142,908,101 bp
Band	7q34	End	142,933,746 bp

Gene location (Mouse)
Chr.	Chromosome 6 (mouse)
Band	6|6 B2.1	Start	41,629,107 bp
Band	6|6 B2.1	End	41,657,703 bp
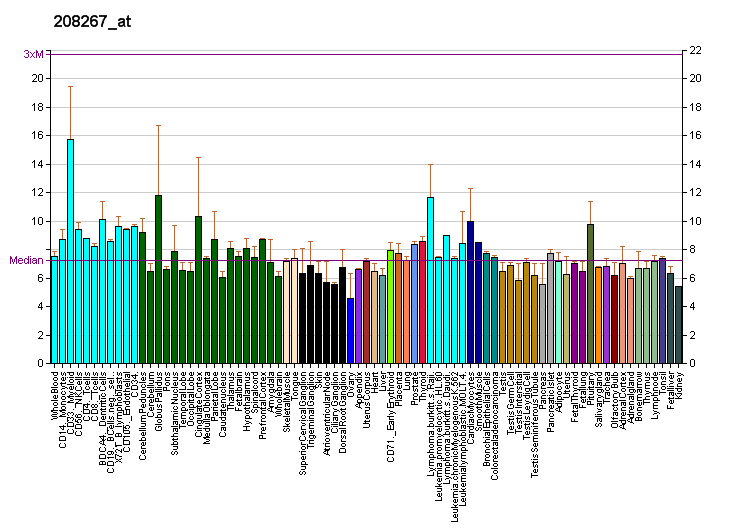
RNA expression pattern
Bgee	Human / Mouse (ortholog); Top expressed in: C1 segment; human kidney; substantia nigra; blood; corpus callosum; hippocampus proper; primary visual cortex; temporal lobe; amygdala; duodenum / Top expressed in: blastocyst; right kidney; morula; human kidney; vasculature; vasculature of organ; spinal cord; embryo; temporal lobe; amygdala; More reference expression data
BioGPS	More reference expression data
Gene ontology
Molecular function	ion channel activity; protein binding; calmodulin binding; metal ion binding; calcium channel activity
Cellular component	integral component of membrane; plasma membrane; integral component of plasma membrane; membrane; apical plasma membrane
Biological process	ion transport; protein tetramerization; calcium ion transport; transmembrane transport; regulation of urine volume; calcium ion homeostasis; calcium ion transmembrane transport; calcium ion import across plasma membrane; protein homotetramerization
Sources:Amigo / QuickGO
Orthologs
Databases	NCBI: entry; OMA: entry
Species	Human	Mouse
Entrez	56302	194352
Ensembl	ENSG00000274348; ENSG00000127412	ENSMUSG00000036899
UniProt	Q9NQA5	P69744
RefSeq (mRNA)	NM_019841	NM_001007572
RefSeq (protein)	NP_062815	NP_001007573
Location (UCSC)	Chr 7: 142.91 – 142.93 Mb	Chr 6: 41.63 – 41.66 Mb
PubMed search
- Wikidata
View/Edit Human	View/Edit Mouse

Transient receptor potential cation channel subfamily V member 5 is a calcium channel protein that in humans is encoded by the TRPV5 gene.

== Function ==
The TRPV5 gene is a member of the transient receptor family and the TRPV subfamily. The calcium-selective channel, TRPV5, encoded by this gene has 6 transmembrane-spanning domains, multiple potential phosphorylation sites, an N-linked glycosylation site, and 5 ANK repeats. This protein forms homotetramers or heterotetramers and is activated by a low internal calcium level.

Both TRPV5 and TRPV6 are expressed in kidney and intestinal epithelial cells. TRPV5 is mainly expressed in kidney epithelial cells, where it plays an important role in the reabsorption of Ca^{2+}, whereas TRPV6 is mainly expressed in the intestine. The enzyme α-klotho increases kidney calcium reabsorption by stabilizing TPRV5. Klotho is a beta-glucuronidase-like enzyme that activates TRPV5 by removal of sialic acid.

== Clinical significance ==
Normally, about 95% to 98% of Ca^{2+} filtered from the blood by the kidney is reabsorbed by the kidney's renal tubule, mediated by TRPV5. Genetic deletion of TRPV5 in mice leads to Ca^{2+} loss in the urine, and consequential hyperparathyroidism, and bone loss.

Autosomal recessive hypercalciuria has been described in a family with a missense, inactivating genetic variant in TRPV5. This variant, known as p.(Val598Met), affects the TRP helix region of TRPV5, which is thought to control channel pore gating, assembly and protein folding.

== Inhibitors ==
- Econazole is a weak inhibitor of both TRPV5 and TRPV6, with an IC_{50} in the micromolar range
- ZINC17988990 is a potent and selective inhibitor of TRPV5, with an IC_{50} of 177nM and good selectivity over TRPV6 and the other TRPV channel subtypes.

== Interactions ==
TRPV5 has been shown to interact with S100A10.

== See also ==
- TRPV
