= 2-Aminoethoxydiphenyl borate =

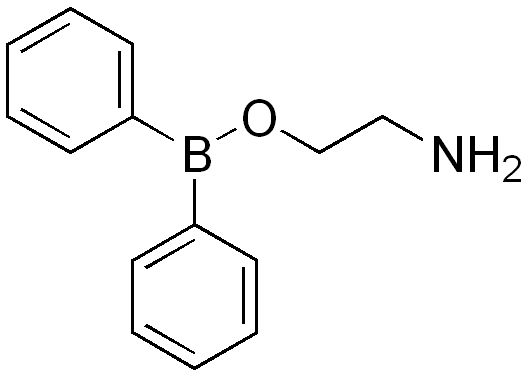

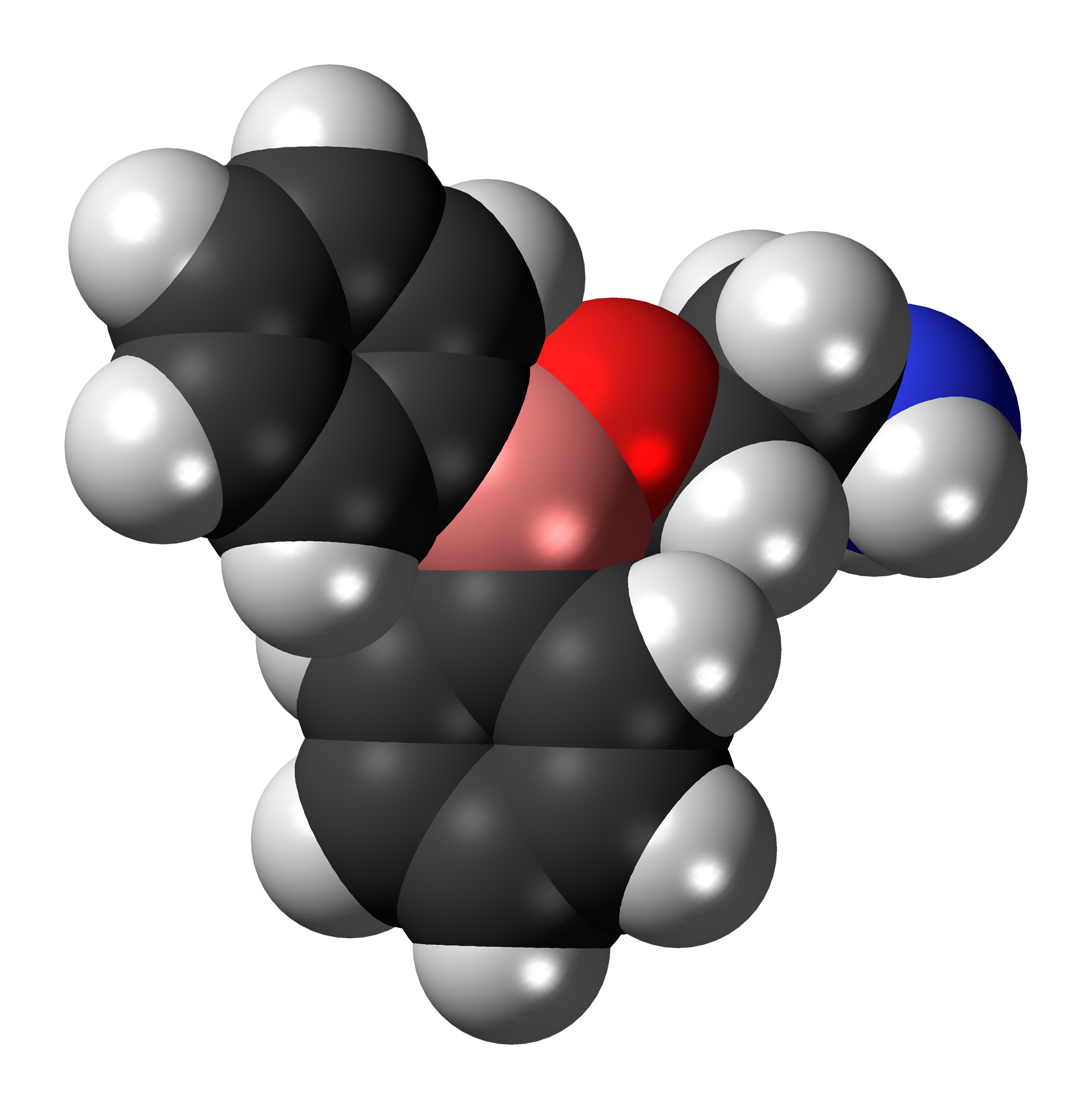

Names
- Preferred IUPAC name 2-[(Diphenylboranyl)oxy]ethan-1-amine
- Other names 2-Aminoethyl diphenyl borate Diphenylborinic acid 2-aminoethyl ester 2-Aminoethyl diphenylborinate

Identifiers
CAS Number	524-95-8
3D model (JSmol)	Interactive image; Interactive image
Abbreviations	2-APB
ChEBI	CHEBI:131184
ChEMBL	ChEMBL169233
ChemSpider	1540
ECHA InfoCard	100.007.607
EC Number	208-366-5
IUPHAR/BPS	2433
KEGG	C20698
PubChem CID	1598
UNII	E4ES684O93
CompTox Dashboard (EPA)	DTXSID0040389
- InChI: InChI=1S/C14H16BNO/c16-11-12-17-15(13-7-3-1-4-8-13)14-9-5-2-6-10-14/h1-10H,11-12,16H2 Key: BLZVCIGGICSWIG-UHFFFAOYSA-N; InChI=1/C14H16BNO/c16-11-12-17-15(13-7-3-1-4-8-13)14-9-5-2-6-10-14/h1-10H,11-12,16H2 Key: BLZVCIGGICSWIG-UHFFFAOYAJ
- SMILES: B(C1=CC=CC=C1)(C2=CC=CC=C2)OCCN; O(B(c1ccccc1)c2ccccc2)CCN

Properties
Chemical formula	C_{14}H_{16}BNO
Molar mass	225.10 g·mol^{−1}
Appearance	white
Density	1.04g/cm3
Melting point	192 to 194 °C (378 to 381 °F; 465 to 467 K)
Boiling point	325.3 °C (617.5 °F; 598.5 K) at 760mmHg

Hazards
- GHS labelling
Pictograms	(GHS07: Exclamation mark)
Signal word	Warning
Hazard statements	H302, H315, H319, H335
Precautionary statements	P261, P264, P270, P271, P280, P301+P312, P302+P352, P304+P340, P305+P351+P338, P312, P321, P330, P332+P313, P337+P313, P362, P403+P233, P405, P501
Flash point	150.6 °C (303.1 °F; 423.8 K)
- Except where otherwise noted, data are given for materials in their standard state (at 25 °C [77 °F], 100 kPa). verify (what is ?) Infobox references

2-Aminoethoxydiphenyl borate (2-APB) is a chemical that acts to inhibit both IP_{3} receptors and TRP channels (although it activates TRPV1, TRPV2, & TRPV3 at higher concentrations). In research it is used to manipulate intracellular release of calcium ions (Ca^{2+}) and modify TRP channel activity, although the lack of specific effects make it less than ideal under some circumstances. Additionally, there is evidence that 2-APB acts directly to inhibit gap junctions made of connexin. Increasing evidence showed that 2-APB is a powerful modifier of store-operated calcium channels (SOC) function, low concentration of 2-APB can enhance SOC while high concentration induces a transient increase followed by complete inhibition.
