= Annexin A2 =

Protein found in humans

ANXA2
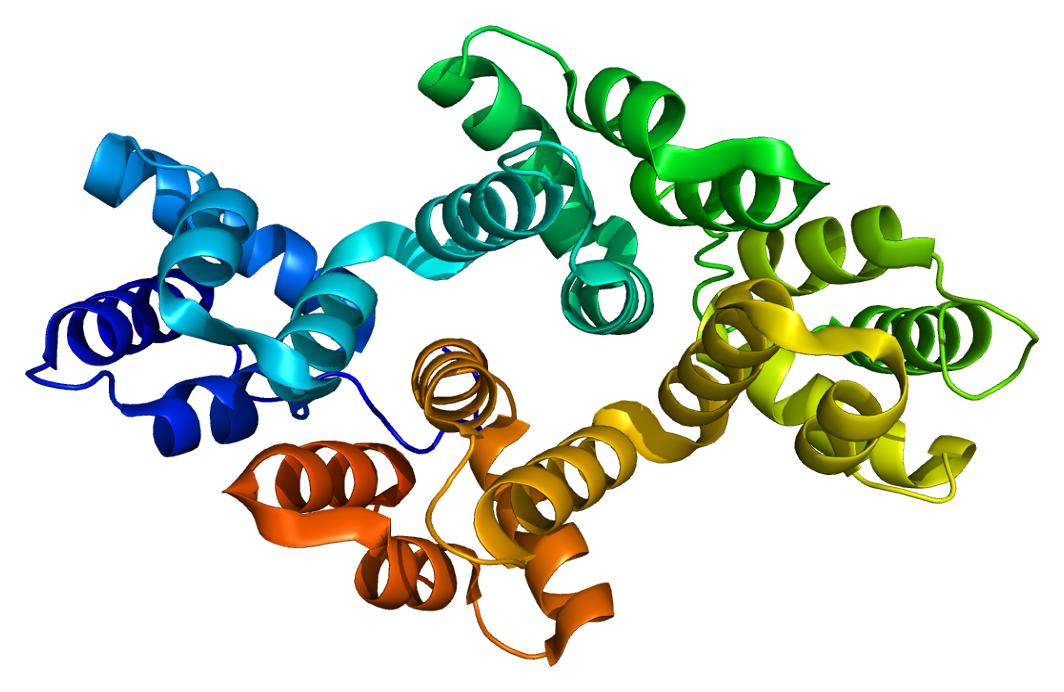

Identifiers
- Aliases: ANXA2, ANX2, ANX2L4, CAL1H, HEL-S-270, LIP2, LPC2, LPC2D, P36, PAP-IV, annexin A2
- External IDs: OMIM: 151740; MGI: 88246; GeneCards: ANXA2
Available structures
PDB	Ortholog search: F2DQP5%20or%20H0YLE2 PDBe F2DQP5,H0YLE2 RCSB
PDB	List of PDB id codes 1W7B, 1XJL, 2HYU, 2HYV, 2HYW, 4DRW, 4FTG, 4HRH

Gene location (Human)
Chr.	Chromosome 15 (human)
Band	15q22.2	Start	60,347,134 bp
Band	15q22.2	End	60,402,883 bp

Gene location (Mouse)
Chr.	Chromosome 9 (mouse)
Band	9 C|9 38.58 cM	Start	69,360,902 bp
Band	9 C|9 38.58 cM	End	69,399,077 bp
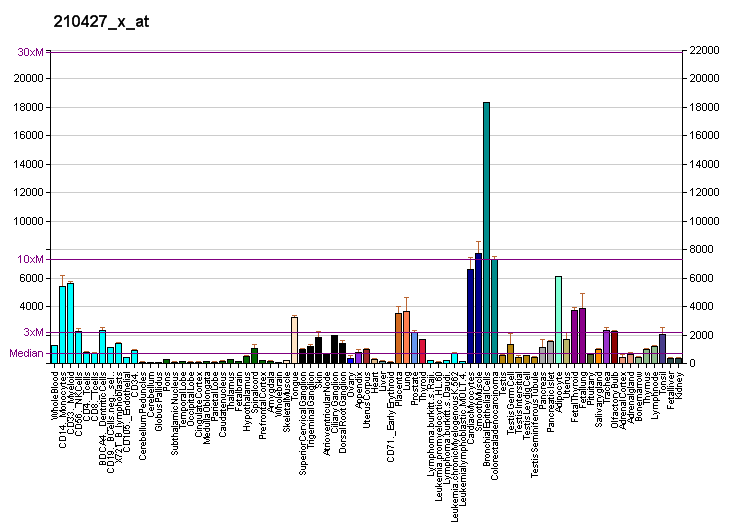

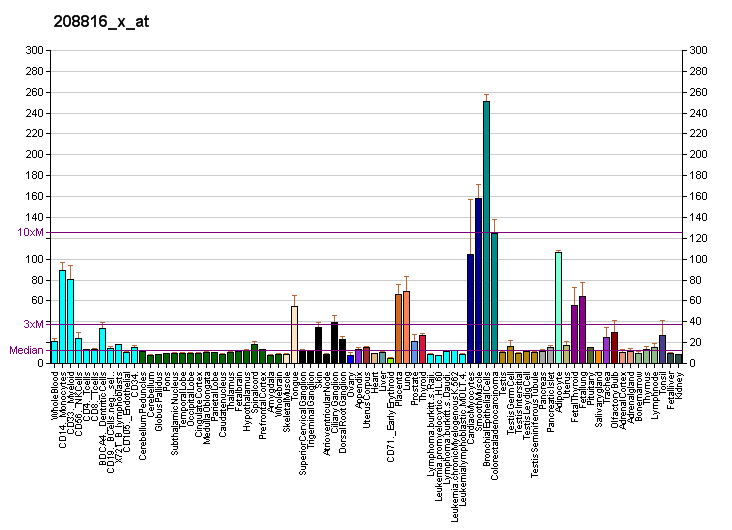

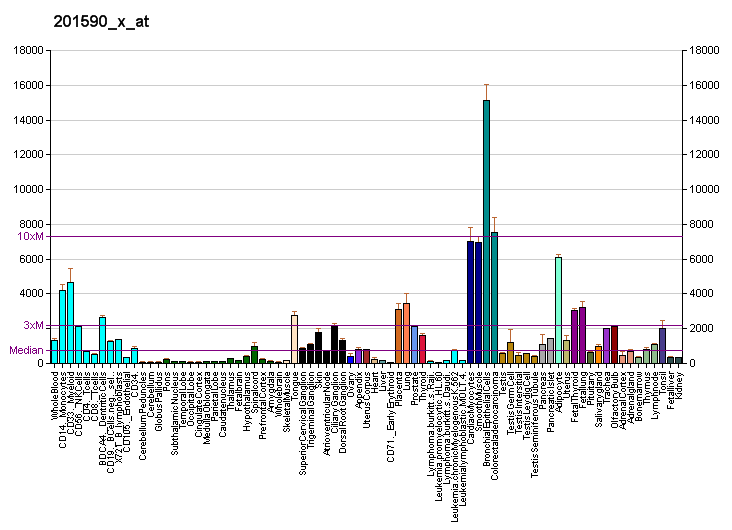
RNA expression pattern
Bgee	Human / Mouse (ortholog); Top expressed in: bronchial epithelial cell; amniotic fluid; nasal epithelium; epithelium of nasopharynx; synovial joint; mucosa of pharynx; visceral pleura; parietal pleura; oral cavity; hair follicle / Top expressed in: corneal stroma; endothelial cell of lymphatic vessel; granulocyte; gastrula; calvaria; skin of external ear; dermis; umbilical cord; conjunctival fornix; right lung lobe; More reference expression data
BioGPS	More reference expression data
Gene ontology
Molecular function	phospholipase inhibitor activity; calcium ion binding; S100 protein binding; phospholipase A2 inhibitor activity; calcium-dependent protein binding; protease binding; cytoskeletal protein binding; protein binding; calcium-dependent phospholipid binding; phosphatidylinositol-4,5-bisphosphate binding; cadherin binding involved in cell-cell adhesion; RNA binding; identical protein binding; bone sialoprotein binding; molecular function regulator; phosphatidylserine binding; calcium channel activity; virion binding; voltage-gated calcium channel activity involved in regulation of cytosolic calcium levels
Cellular component	vesicle; cytosol; endosome; membrane; late endosome membrane; melanosome; ruffle; plasma membrane; lipid droplet; myelin sheath adaxonal region; Schmidt-Lanterman incisure; PCSK9-AnxA2 complex; macropinosome; basement membrane; cell surface; lysosomal membrane; basolateral plasma membrane; cell cortex; midbody; early endosome; perinuclear region of cytoplasm; sarcolemma; extrinsic component of plasma membrane; extracellular exosome; nucleus; extracellular space; azurophil granule lumen; cytoplasm; membrane raft; extracellular matrix; extracellular region; protein-containing complex; collagen-containing extracellular matrix
Biological process	negative regulation of low-density lipoprotein particle receptor catabolic process; positive regulation of protein phosphorylation; protein heterotetramerization; fibrinolysis; body fluid secretion; collagen fibril organization; positive regulation of fibroblast proliferation; response to thyroid hormone; positive regulation of binding; positive regulation of vesicle fusion; membrane raft assembly; angiogenesis; vesicle budding from membrane; osteoclast development; cell-cell adhesion; negative regulation of catalytic activity; positive regulation of receptor recycling; neutrophil degranulation; positive regulation of low-density lipoprotein particle clearance; positive regulation of low-density lipoprotein particle receptor binding; positive regulation of low-density lipoprotein receptor activity; positive regulation of receptor-mediated endocytosis involved in cholesterol transport; negative regulation of formation of structure involved in a symbiotic process; positive regulation of vacuole organization; interleukin-12-mediated signaling pathway; protein localization to plasma membrane; growth plate cartilage development; regulation of plasminogen activation; biomineral tissue development; positive regulation of chondrocyte differentiation; positive regulation by host of viral process; regulation of cytosolic calcium ion concentration; positive regulation of calcium ion transport; endocardial cell differentiation; calcium ion transmembrane transport; positive regulation of viral life cycle
Sources:Amigo / QuickGO
Orthologs
Databases	NCBI: entry; OMA: entry
Species	Human	Mouse
Entrez	302	12306
Ensembl	ENSG00000182718	ENSMUSG00000032231
UniProt	P07355	P07356
RefSeq (mRNA)	NM_001002857; NM_001002858; NM_001136015; NM_004039	NM_007585
RefSeq (protein)	NP_001002857; NP_001002858; NP_001129487; NP_004030	NP_031611
Location (UCSC)	Chr 15: 60.35 – 60.4 Mb	Chr 9: 69.36 – 69.4 Mb
PubMed search
- Wikidata
View/Edit Human	View/Edit Mouse

Annexin A2 also known as annexin II is a protein that in humans is encoded by the ANXA2 gene.

Annexin 2 is involved in diverse cellular processes such as cell motility (especially that of the epithelial cells), linkage of membrane-associated protein complexes to the actin cytoskeleton, endocytosis, fibrinolysis, ion channel formation, and cell matrix interactions. It is a calcium-dependent phospholipid-binding protein whose function is to help organize exocytosis of intracellular proteins to the extracellular domain. Annexin II is a pleiotropic protein meaning that its function is dependent on place and time in the body.

== Gene ==
The ANXA2 gene, located at 15q22.2, has three pseudogenes located on chromosomes 4, 9 and 10, respectively. Multiple alternatively spliced transcript variants encoding different isoforms have been found for this gene.

== Function ==
This protein is a member of the annexin family. Members of this calcium-dependent phospholipid-binding protein family play a role in the regulation of cellular growth and in signal transduction pathways. This protein functions as an autocrine factor which heightens osteoclast formation and bone resorption. Epigenetic regulation of Annexin A2 has been identified as a key determinant of mesenchymal transformation in brain tumors. Maternal deficiency of the ANXA2 gene contributes to shallow decidual invasion by placental cytotrophoblast cells. These findings highlight the maternal contribution to the pathogenesis of severe preeclampsia.

Annexin A2 has been proposed to function inside the cell in sorting of endosomes and outside the cell in anticoagulant reactions.

== Interactions ==
Annexin A2 has been shown to interact with Prohibitin, CEACAM1, S100A10, PCNA, complement Factor H, and a number of viral factors including the HPV16 minor capsid protein L2.

== See also ==
- Annexin
