= TRPV3 =

Protein-coding gene in humans

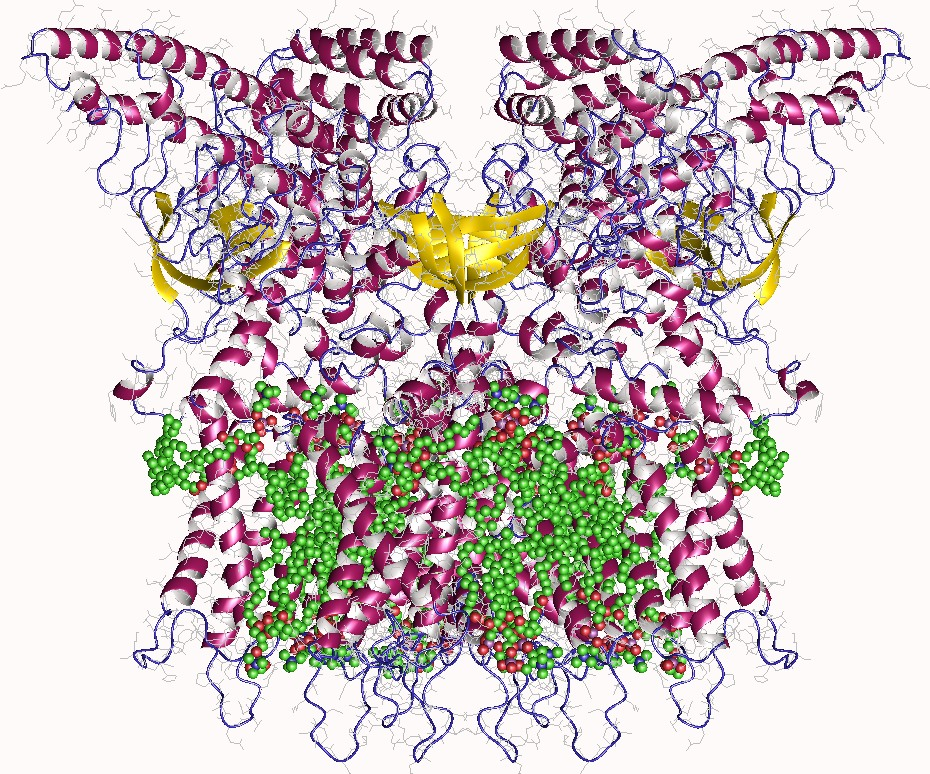

Identifiers
- Aliases: TRPV3, FNEPPK2, OLMS, VRL3, transient receptor potential cation channel subfamily V member 3, OLMS1
- External IDs: OMIM: 607066; MGI: 2181407; GeneCards: TRPV3
Available structures
PDB	Ortholog search: PDBe RCSB
PDB	List of PDB id codes 4N5Q

Gene location (Human)
Chr.	Chromosome 17 (human)
Band	17p13.2	Start	3,510,502 bp
Band	17p13.2	End	3,557,812 bp

Gene location (Mouse)
Chr.	Chromosome 11 (mouse)
Band	11 B4|11 45.25 cM	Start	73,158,214 bp
Band	11 B4|11 45.25 cM	End	73,191,189 bp
RNA expression pattern
Bgee	Human / Mouse (ortholog); Top expressed in: skin of leg; skin of abdomen; sural nerve; testicle; gonad; bone marrow cell; C1 segment; Brodmann area 9; right frontal lobe; rectum / Top expressed in: lip; zone of skin; secondary oocyte; primary oocyte; esophagus; vasculature; vasculature of organ; zygote; temporal lobe; colon; More reference expression data
BioGPS	n/a
Gene ontology
Molecular function	ion channel activity; cation channel activity; calcium channel activity
Cellular component	integral component of membrane; receptor complex; plasma membrane; membrane; integral component of plasma membrane
Biological process	positive regulation of calcium ion import; response to heat; ion transport; calcium ion transmembrane transport; calcium ion transport; negative regulation of hair cycle; response to temperature stimulus; transmembrane transport
Sources:Amigo / QuickGO
Orthologs
Databases	NCBI: entry; OMA: entry
Species	Human	Mouse
Entrez	162514	246788
Ensembl	ENSG00000167723	ENSMUSG00000043029
UniProt	Q8NET8	Q8K424
RefSeq (mRNA)	NM_001258205; NM_145068	NM_145099; NM_001371006
RefSeq (protein)	NP_001245134; NP_659505	NP_659567; NP_001357935
Location (UCSC)	Chr 17: 3.51 – 3.56 Mb	Chr 11: 73.16 – 73.19 Mb
PubMed search
- Wikidata
View/Edit Human	View/Edit Mouse

Transient receptor potential cation channel, subfamily V, member 3, also known as TRPV3, is a human gene encoding the protein of the same name.

The TRPV3 protein belongs to a family of nonselective cation channels that function in a variety of processes, including temperature sensation and vasoregulation. The thermosensitive members of this family are expressed in subsets of human sensory neurons that terminate in the skin, and are activated at distinct physiological temperatures. This channel is activated at temperatures between 22 and 40 degrees C. The gene lies in close proximity to another family member (TRPV1) gene on chromosome 17, and the two encoded proteins are thought to associate with each other to form heteromeric channels.

== Function ==
The TRPV3 channel has wide tissue expression that is especially high in the skin (keratinocytes) but also in the brain. It functions as a molecular sensor for innocuous warm temperatures. Mice lacking these protein are unable to sense elevated temperatures (>33 °C) but are able to sense cold and noxious heat. In addition to thermosensation TRPV3 channels seem to play a role in hair growth because mutations in the TRPV3 gene cause hair loss in mice. The role of TRPV3 channels in the brain is unclear, but appears to play a role in mood regulation. The protective effects of the natural product, incensole acetate were partially mediated by TRPV3 channels.

== Modulation ==
The TRPV3 channel is directly activated by various natural compounds like carvacrol, thymol and eugenol. Several other monoterpenoids which cause either feeling of warmth or are skin sensitizers can also open the channel. Monoterpenoids also induce agonist-specific desensitization of TRPV3 channels in a calcium-independent manner.

Resolvin E1 (RvE1), RvD2, and 17R-RvD1 (see resolvins) are metabolites of the omega 3 fatty acids, eicosapentaenoic acid (for RvE1) or docosahexaenoic acid (for RvD2 and 17R-RvD1). These metabolites are members of the specialized proresolving mediators (SPMs) class of metabolites that function to resolve diverse inflammatory reactions and diseases in animal models and, it is proposed, humans. These SPMs also dampen pain perception arising from various inflammation-based causes in animal models. The mechanism behind their pain-dampening effects involves the inhibition of TRPV3, probably (in at least certain cases) by an indirect effect wherein they activate other receptors located on neurons or nearby microglia or astrocytes. CMKLR1, GPR32, FPR2, and NMDA receptors have been proposed to be the receptors through which these SPMs operate to down-regulate TRPV3 and thereby pain perception.

2-Aminoethoxydiphenyl borate (2-APB) is a mixed agonist-antagonist of the TRPV3 receptor, acting as an antagonist at low concentrations but showing agonist activity when used in larger amounts. Drofenine also acts as a TRPV3 agonist in addition to its other actions. Conversely, icilin has been shown to act as a TRPV3 antagonist, as well as a TRPM8 agonist. Forsythoside B acts as a TRPV3 inhibitor among other actions. Farnesyl pyrophosphate is an endogenous agonist of TRPV3, while incensole acetate from frankincense also acts as an agonist at TRPV3. TRPV3-74a is a selective TRPV3 antagonist.

== Ligands ==
=== Agonists ===
- Cannabidiol
- Tetrahydrocannabivarin
- Cannabigerolic acid
- Cannabigerovarin

== See also ==
- TRPV
- Endocannabinoid system
