= Klotho (biology) =

Human enzyme

KL

Identifiers
- Aliases: KL, entrez:9365, klotho, HFTC3, KLA
- External IDs: OMIM: 604824; MGI: 1101771; GeneCards: KL
Enzyme activity
EC #	BRENDA	ExPASy	KEGG	MetaCyc
3.2.1.31	↗	↗	↗	↗

Gene location (Human)
Chr.	Chromosome 13 (human)
Band	13q13.1	Start	33,016,423 bp
Band	13q13.1	End	33,066,143 bp

Gene location (Mouse)
Chr.	Chromosome 5 (mouse)
Band	5|5 G3	Start	150,876,072 bp
Band	5|5 G3	End	150,917,282 bp
RNA expression pattern
Bgee	Human / Mouse (ortholog); Top expressed in: Epithelium of choroid plexus; kidney tubule; renal medulla; glomerulus; metanephric glomerulus; human kidney; corpus epididymis; placenta; Region I of hippocampus proper; testicle / Top expressed in: choroid plexus of fourth ventricle; Epithelium of choroid plexus; right kidney; human kidney; proximal tubule; hippocampus proper; primary visual cortex; CA3 field; submandibular gland; islet of Langerhans; More reference expression data
BioGPS	n/a
Gene ontology
Molecular function	hydrolase activity, hydrolyzing O-glycosyl compounds; hormone activity; beta-glucuronidase activity; signal transducer activity; hydrolase activity, acting on glycosyl bonds; vitamin D binding; fibroblast growth factor binding; beta-glucosidase activity; hydrolase activity; phosphatidylinositol-4,5-bisphosphate 3-kinase activity; fibroblast growth factor receptor binding; 1-phosphatidylinositol-3-kinase activity
Cellular component	integral component of membrane; membrane; plasma membrane; integral component of plasma membrane; extracellular region; apical plasma membrane; extracellular exosome; intracellular anatomical structure; extracellular space
Biological process	calcium ion homeostasis; positive regulation of bone mineralization; ageing; MAPK cascade; positive regulation of MAPKKK cascade by fibroblast growth factor receptor signaling pathway; energy reserve metabolic process; metabolism; glycosyl compound metabolic process; phosphatidylinositol phosphate biosynthetic process; insulin receptor signaling pathway; fibroblast growth factor receptor signaling pathway; phosphatidylinositol-3-phosphate biosynthetic process; carbohydrate metabolic process; regulation of signaling receptor activity; positive regulation of protein kinase B signaling; regulation of molecular function
Sources:Amigo / QuickGO
Orthologs
Databases	NCBI: entry; OMA: entry
Species	Human	Mouse
Entrez	9365	16591
Ensembl	ENSG00000133116	ENSMUSG00000058488
UniProt	Q9UEF7	O35082
RefSeq (mRNA)	NM_004795; NM_153683	NM_013823
RefSeq (protein)	NP_004786	NP_038851
Location (UCSC)	Chr 13: 33.02 – 33.07 Mb	Chr 5: 150.88 – 150.92 Mb
PubMed search
- Wikidata
View/Edit Human	View/Edit Mouse

Klotho is an enzyme that in humans is encoded by the KL gene. The three subfamilies of klotho are α-klotho, β-klotho, and γ-klotho. α-klotho activates FGF23, and β-klotho activates FGF19 and FGF21. When the subfamily is not specified, the word "klotho" typically refers to the α-klotho subfamily, because α-klotho was discovered before the other members.

α-klotho is highly expressed in the brain, liver and kidney. β-klotho is predominantly expressed in the liver. γ-klotho is expressed in the skin.

Klotho can exist in a membrane-bound form or a (hormonal) soluble, circulating form. Proteases can convert the membrane-bound form into the circulating form.

The KL gene encodes a type-I single-pass transmembrane protein that is related to β-glucuronidases. Reduced production of this protein has been observed in patients with chronic kidney failure (CKF), and this may be one of the factors underlying degenerative processes (e.g., arteriosclerosis, osteoporosis, and skin atrophy) seen in CKF. Mutations within the family have been associated with ageing, bone loss and alcohol consumption. Transgenic mice that overexpress klotho live longer than wild-type mice.

== Structure on the chromosome ==
The α-klotho gene is located on chromosome 13, and is translated into a single-pass integral membrane protein.

The β-Klotho gene is located on chromosome 4. The protein shares homology (43.1% identity and 60.1% similarity) with α-klotho. The β-Klotho gene and β-Klotho protein should not be confused with the alpha-cut and beta-cut of alpha-klotho, which releases KL1+KL2 and KL2 domain of α-klotho into the extracellular matrix and bloodstream, respectively.

== Isoforms of α-klotho ==
There are two main isoforms.

One isoform is the full-length Klotho mRNA, that includes signal peptide, KL1 domain, linker region, KL2 domain, transmembrane region and intracellular domain. This gets produced into a full protein that is stuck in the membrane and subsequently is cleaved into soluble klotho proteins that are found in circulation in the bloodstream.

The other isoform is a truncated mRNA, that terminates after the KL1 domain and thus the transmembrane region gets cleaved off and the produced protein is excreted into the extracellular medium.

== Domains / structure of the protein ==
The intracellular portion of the α-klotho protein is short (11 amino acids), whereas the extracellular portion is long (980 amino acids). The transmembrane portion is also comparatively short (21 amino acids). The extracellular portion contains two repeat sequences, termed the KL1 (about 450 amino acids) and KL2 (about 430 amino acids) domains. In the kidney and the choroid plexus of the brain, the transmembrane protein can be proteolytically cleaved to produce a 130-Kilo-Dalton, soluble form of α-klotho protein, released into the circulation and cerebrospinal fluid, respectively. In humans, the secreted form of klotho is more dominant than the membrane form.

== Soluble klotho protein fragments ==
The nomenclature of physiologically appearing klotho polypeptide fragments can be confusing. In order to distinguish the different circulating polypeptides (cleavage fragments and isoforms), newer papers follow the following nomenclature

mKL: mKL135 stands for the full-length, transmembrane form

pKL: Processed Klotho (p-KL) comes from the processing of full-length transmembrane klotho protein. This cleavage releases the ectodomains into the extracellular medium, while the transmembrane domain (with or without KL2) remains in the cell membrane. This includes pKL65 (65 kDa in size) and pKL130 (130 kDa in size).

sKL: The protein resulting from the shorter transcript for a putatively secreted protein (s-KL), which is produced as a soluble polypeptide without transmembrane domain.

It is important to keep in mind that previously, the processed (cleaved) fragments of klotho have also been named "sKL130" and "sKL65". in this case, the "s" stands for soluble.

== Function ==
Klotho is a transmembrane protein that, in addition to other effects, provides some control over the sensitivity of the organism to insulin and appears to be involved in ageing. Its discovery was documented in 1997 by Makoto Kuro-o et al. The name of the gene comes from Klotho or Clotho, one of the Moirai, or Fates, in Greek mythology, who spins the thread of human life. As the kidney is the key organ expressing Klotho, its functions are mediated via the kidney. Recent study reported that Klotho regulates phosphate and calcium homeostasis in the proximal and distal nephron segments of the kidney, respectively. Many of the functions of Klotho related to aging or renoprotection come from its role in phosphate homeostasis in partnership with FGF23.

Klotho binds to the endocrine FGF23 changes cellular calcium homeostasis, by both increasing the expression and activity of TRPV5 (decreasing phosphate reabsorption in the kidney) and decreasing that of TRPC6 (decreasing phosphate absorption from the intestine). Klotho increases kidney calcium reabsorption by stabilizing TRPV5.About 95% to 98% of Ca^{2+} filtered from the blood by the kidney is normally reabsorbed by the kidney's distal renal tubule, which is mediated by TRPV5.

The klotho protein is a novel β-glucuronidase (EC number 3.2.1.31) capable of hydrolyzing steroid β-glucuronides. Genetic variants in KLOTHO have been associated with human aging, and klotho protein has been shown to be a circulating factor detectable in serum that declines with age.

β-Klotho: The binding of the endocrine fibroblast growth factors (FGF's, viz., FGF19 and FGF21) to their fibroblast growth factor receptors, is promoted via their interactions as co-receptors with β-klotho. Loss of β-Klotho abolishes all effects of FGF21.

== Clinical significance ==
α-klotho can suppress oxidative stress and inflammation, thereby reducing endothelial dysfunction and atherosclerosis. Blood plasma α-klotho is increased by aerobic exercise, thereby reducing endothelial dysfunction.

β-klotho activation of FGF21 protein has a protective effect on heart muscle cells. Obesity is characterized by FGF21 resistance, believed to be caused by the inhibition of β-klotho by the inflammatory cell signalling protein (cytokine) tumor necrosis factor alpha, but there is evidence against this mechanism.

Klotho is required for oligodendrocyte maturation, myelin integrity, and can protect neurons from toxic effects. Mice deficient in klotho have a reduced number of synapses and cognitive deficits, whereas mice overexpressing klotho have enhanced learning and memory. Research with injections of klotho in primates demonstrates a positive effect on memory that lasts for as long as two weeks; this could have implications for research with humans. Interestingly the cognitive effects in rhesus monkeys were observed even with subcutaneous injection despite previous results showing that klotho protein fails to cross the blood–brain barrier.

Reduced klotho expression is seen in the lung macrophages of smokers. An abnormal form of autophagy associated with reduced expression of klotho is linked to the pathogenesis of chronic obstructive pulmonary disease. (Although normal autophagy helps maintain muscle, excessive autophagy causes loss of muscle mass.)

It has been found that the decreased klotho expression may be due to DNA hypermethylation, which may have been induced by the overexpression of DNMT3a. Klotho may be a reliable gene for early detection of methylation changes in oral tissues, and can be used as a target for therapeutic modification in oral cancer during the early stages.

Klotho-deficient mice manifest a syndrome resembling accelerated human ageing and display extensive and accelerated arteriosclerosis. Additionally, they exhibit impaired endothelium dependent vasodilation and impaired angiogenesis, suggesting that klotho protein may protect the cardiovascular system through endothelium-derived nitric oxide production.

Klotho could play a protective role in Alzheimer's disease patients.

== Effects on aging ==
Reduced α-klotho or FGF23 can result in impaired phosphate excretion from the kidney, leading to hyperphosphatemia. In mice, this leads to a phenotype characteristic of premature aging, which can be mitigated by feeding the mice a low phosphate diet.

The plasma (soluble) form of α-klotho is most easily measured, and has been shown to decrease after 40 years of age in humans. Lower plasma levels of α-klotho in older adults is associated with increased frailty and all-cause mortality. Physical activity has been shown to increase plasma α-klotho.

Mice lacking either fibroblast growth factor 23 or the α-klotho enzyme display premature aging due to hyperphosphatemia. Many of these symptoms can be alleviated by feeding the mice a low phosphate diet.

Although the majority of research has explored klotho's absence, it was demonstrated that klotho over-expression in mice extended their average lifespan between 19% and 31% compared to normal mice. In addition, variations in the Klotho gene (SNP Rs9536314) are associated with both life extension and increased cognition in human populations and mice, but only if the gene expression was heterozygous, not homozygous. The cognitive benefits of α-klotho are primarily seen late in life.

Klotho increases membrane expression of the inward rectifier ATP-dependent potassium channel ROMK. Klotho-deficient mice show increased production of vitamin D, and altered mineral-ion homeostasis is suggested to cause premature aging‑like phenotypes, because reduced vitamin D activity from dietary restriction reverses the premature aging‑like phenotypes and prolongs survival in these mutants. These results suggest that aging‑like phenotypes were due to klotho-associated vitamin D metabolic abnormalities (hypervitaminosis).

Klotho is an antagonist of the Wnt signaling pathway, and chronic Wnt stimulation can lead to stem cell depletion and aging. Klotho inhibition of Wnt signaling can inhibit cancer. The anti-aging effects of klotho are also a consequence of increased resistance to inflammation and oxidative stress.

Extracellular vesicles (EV) in young mice carried more copies of klotho-producing mRNA than those from old mice. Transfusing young EVs into older mice helped rebuild their muscles.

The presence of senescent cells decreases α-klotho levels. Senolytic drugs reduce the level of these cells, allowing α-klotho levels to increase.
