= Ru360 =

Names
- IUPAC name azanide;formic acid;ruthenium(5+);trichloride;hydrate
- Other names Ru_{360}; (μ)[(HCO_{2})(NH_{3})_{4}Ru]_{2}OCl_{3}; Obftar

Identifiers
CAS Number	133399-54-9
3D model (JSmol)	Interactive image
ChemSpider	169680
PubChem CID	195745 charge error
- InChI: InChI=1S/2CH2O2.3ClH.8H3N.O.2Ru/c2*2-1-3;;;;;;;;;;;;;;/h2*1H,(H,2,3);3*1H;8*1H3;;;/q;;;;;;;;;;;;;-2;+3;+4/p-5 Key: WQWDSQZHHKHDOS-UHFFFAOYSA-I
- SMILES: C(=O)[O-].C(=O)[O-].N.N.N.N.N.N.N.N.[Cl-].[Cl-].[Cl-].[Ru+3][O-2][Ru+4]

Properties
Chemical formula	C_{2}H_{26}Cl_{3}N_{8}O_{5}Ru_{2}
Molar mass	550.77 g·mol^{−1}
Appearance	Reddish brown solid
Solubility in water	deoxygenated H_{2}O
- Except where otherwise noted, data are given for materials in their standard state (at 25 °C [77 °F], 100 kPa). Infobox references

Ru_{360} is an oxo-bridged dinuclear ruthenium ammine complex with an absorption spectrum maximum at 360 nm. It is an analog of ruthenium red, a well-known effective inhibitor of the mitochondrial calcium uniporter.

Ru_{360} was discovered after scientists found that commercial preparations of ruthenium red were often less than 20% pure, and that the crude mixture produced a stronger inhibition than the purified product. This component was later isolated and its structure determined, Ru_{360} has structural formula (μ-O)[(HCO_{2})(NH_{3})_{4}Ru]_{2}Cl_{3}, that is, an oxygen-linked chain only two octahedral ruthenium–ammine units rather than the three of ruthenium red. One of the ruthenium atoms is in a +3 oxidation state, and the other in a +4 oxidation state. In addition to the four ammonia ligands, each ruthenium also has one formate group and there are a total of three chloride ions to balance the charge. In solution, chloride or hydroxide groups displace the formates.

Since Ru_{360} inhibits the flow of calcium into mitochondria, which can prevent the opening of the mitochondrial permeability transition pore, it has been investigated as a therapeutic treatment for stroke and heart attack.
