= RN-9893 =

Chemical compound

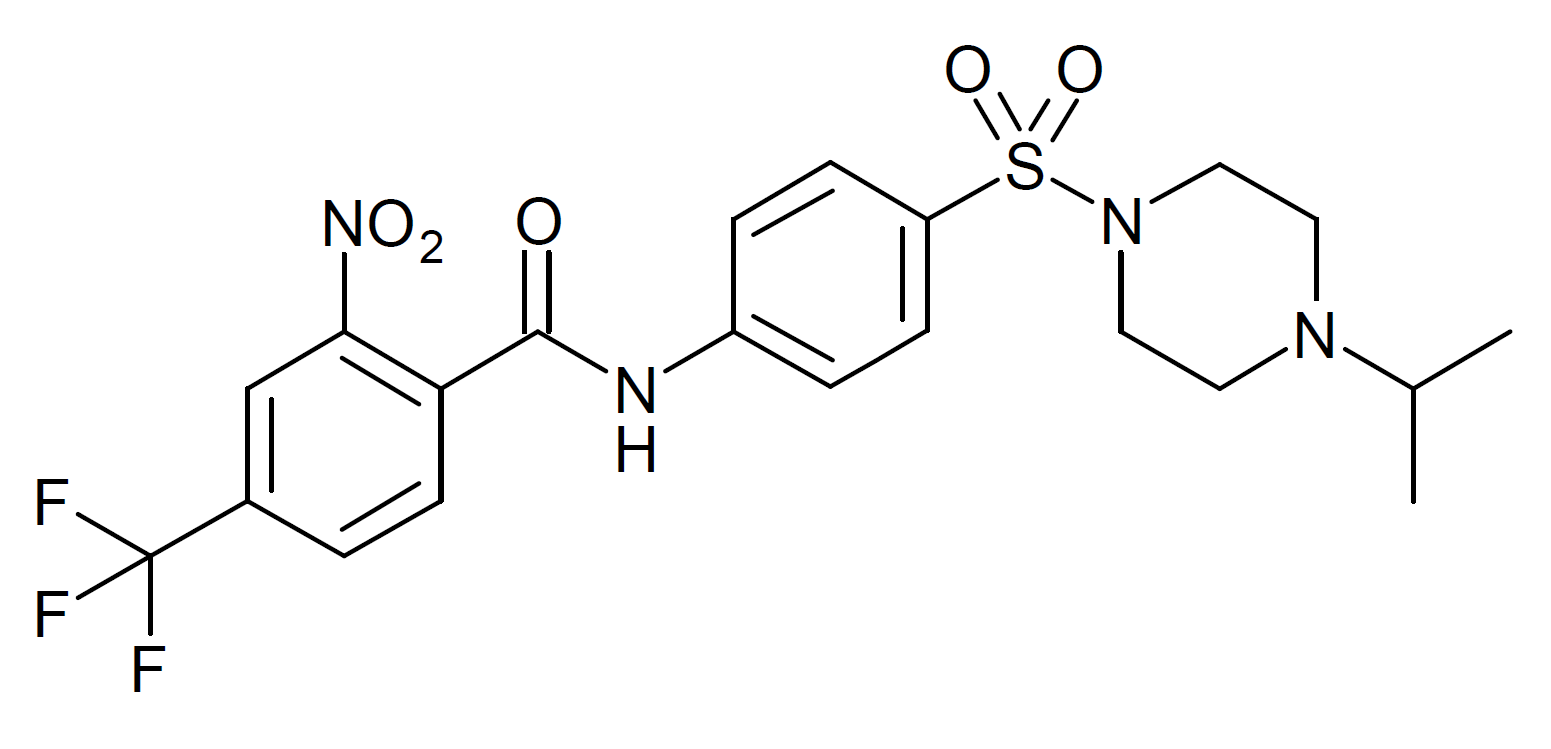

Identifiers
- IUPAC name: 2-nitro-N-[4-(4-propan-2-ylpiperazin-1-yl)sulfonylphenyl]-4-(trifluoromethyl)benzamide
- CAS Number: 2109450-40-8
- PubChem CID: 121513880

Chemical and physical data
- Formula: C_{21}H_{23}F_{3}N_{4}O_{5}S
- Molar mass: 500.49 g·mol^{−1}
- 3D model (JSmol): Interactive image
- SMILES: CC(C)N1CCN(CC1)S(=O)(=O)C2=CC=C(C=C2)NC(=O)C3=C(C=C(C=C3)C(F)(F)F)[N+](=O)[O-]
- InChI: InChI=1S/C21H23F3N4O5S/c1-14(2)26-9-11-27(12-10-26)34(32,33)17-6-4-16(5-7-17)25-20(29)18-8-3-15(21(22,23)24)13-19(18)28(30)31/h3-8,13-14H,9-12H2,1-2H3,(H,25,29); Key:KORKKQLDGMHNKO-UHFFFAOYSA-N

RN-9893 is a drug which acts as a potent and selective blocker of the TRPV4 ion channel. It has been used to investigate the role of TRPV4 channels in the function of heart valves.

== See also ==
- HC-067047
- SET2
