= Ruthenium red =

Ammoniated ruthenium oxychloride

Identifiers
CAS Number	11103-72-3
3D model (JSmol)	Interactive image
ChEMBL	ChEMBL2068405
ChemSpider	7827798
ECHA InfoCard	100.228.922
EC Number	802-133-7
PubChem CID	117587625
UNII	KU6M163B0R
CompTox Dashboard (EPA)	DTXSID80108179
- InChI: InChI=1S/6ClH.14H3N.2H2O.3Ru/h6*1H;14*1H3;2*1H2;;;/q;;;;;;;;;;;;;;;;;;;;;;+4;2*+5/p-6 Key: CIBHIQPXTCXIRW-UHFFFAOYSA-H; InChI=1/6ClH.14H3N.2H2O.3Ru/h6*1H;14*1H3;2*1H2;;;/q;;;;;;;;;;;;;;;;;;;;;;+4;2*+5/p-6 Key: CIBHIQPXTCXIRW-CYFPFDDLAK
- SMILES: [Ru+5].[Ru+5].[Ru+4].[Cl-].[Cl-].[Cl-].[Cl-].[Cl-].[Cl-].O.O.N.N.N.N.N.N.N.N.N.N.N.N.N.N

Properties
Chemical formula	Cl_{6}H_{42}N_{14}O_{2}Ru_{3}
Molar mass	786.34 g·mol^{−1}
Appearance	Brownish-red solid

Hazards
- GHS labelling
Pictograms	(GHS07: Exclamation mark)
Signal word	Warning
Hazard statements	H302, H315, H319
Precautionary statements	P264, P264+P265, P270, P280, P301+P317, P302+P352, P305+P351+P338, P321, P330, P332+P317, P337+P317, P362+P364, P501
- Except where otherwise noted, data are given for materials in their standard state (at 25 °C [77 °F], 100 kPa). verify (what is ?) Infobox references

Ruthenium red (RR), also known as ammoniated ruthenium oxychloride, is an inorganic compound used as a dye in histology to stain aldehyde fixed mucopolysaccharides.

== Structure ==
The chloride has the chemical formula [Ru_{3}O_{2}(NH_{3})_{14}]Cl_{6}·4H_{2}O. A thiosulfate been characterized with the formula [Ru_{3}O_{2}(NH_{3})_{14}](S_{2}O_{3})_{3}·4H_{2}O. The cation is composed of a linear [(NH_{3})_{5}-Ru^{III}-O-(NH_{3})_{4}Ru^{IV}-O-Ru^{III}-(NH_{3})_{5}]^{6+} backbone formed from three ruthenium coordination octahedra.

The inhibition of mitochondrial Ca^{2+} uptake is attributed to an impurity with the formula μ-O-[(HCO_{2})(NH_{3})_{4}Ru]_{2}Cl_{3}. This compound crystallizes in the orthorhombic system (space group Pnn2 (No. 34), a = 8.588 Å, b = 13.335 Å, c = 7.602 Å, cell volume = 870.6 Å^{3}, Z = 2 units per cell).

== Preparation ==
The chloride is prepared by the aerial oxidation of ruthenium(III) chloride in aqueous ammonia solution. The thiosulfate is prepared by treating an aqueous solution of the chloride with sodium thiosulfate.

== Uses ==
Ruthenium red has been used as a pharmacological tool to study specific cellular mechanisms. Selectivity is a significant issue in such studies as RR is known to interact with many proteins. These include mammalian ion channels (CatSper1, TASK, RyR1, RyR2, RyR3, TRPM6, TRPM8, TRPV1, TRPV2, TRPV3, TRPV4, TRPV5, TRPV6, TRPA1, mCa1, mCa2, CALHM1) TRPP3, a plant ion channel, Ca^{2+}-ATPase, mitochondrial Ca^{2+} uniporter, tubulin, myosin light-chain phosphatase, and Ca^{2+} binding proteins such as calmodulin. Ruthenium red displays nanomolar potency against several of its binding partners (e.g. TRPV4, ryanodine receptors,...). For example, it is a potent inhibitor of intracellular calcium release by ryanodine receptors (Kd ~20 nM). As a TRPA1 blocker, it assists in reducing the airway inflammation caused by pepper spray.

RR has been used on plant material since 1890 for staining pectins, mucilages, and gums. RR is a stereoselective stain for pectic acid, insofar as the staining site occurs between each monomer unit and the next adjacent neighbor.
