= GSK1016790A =

Chemical compound

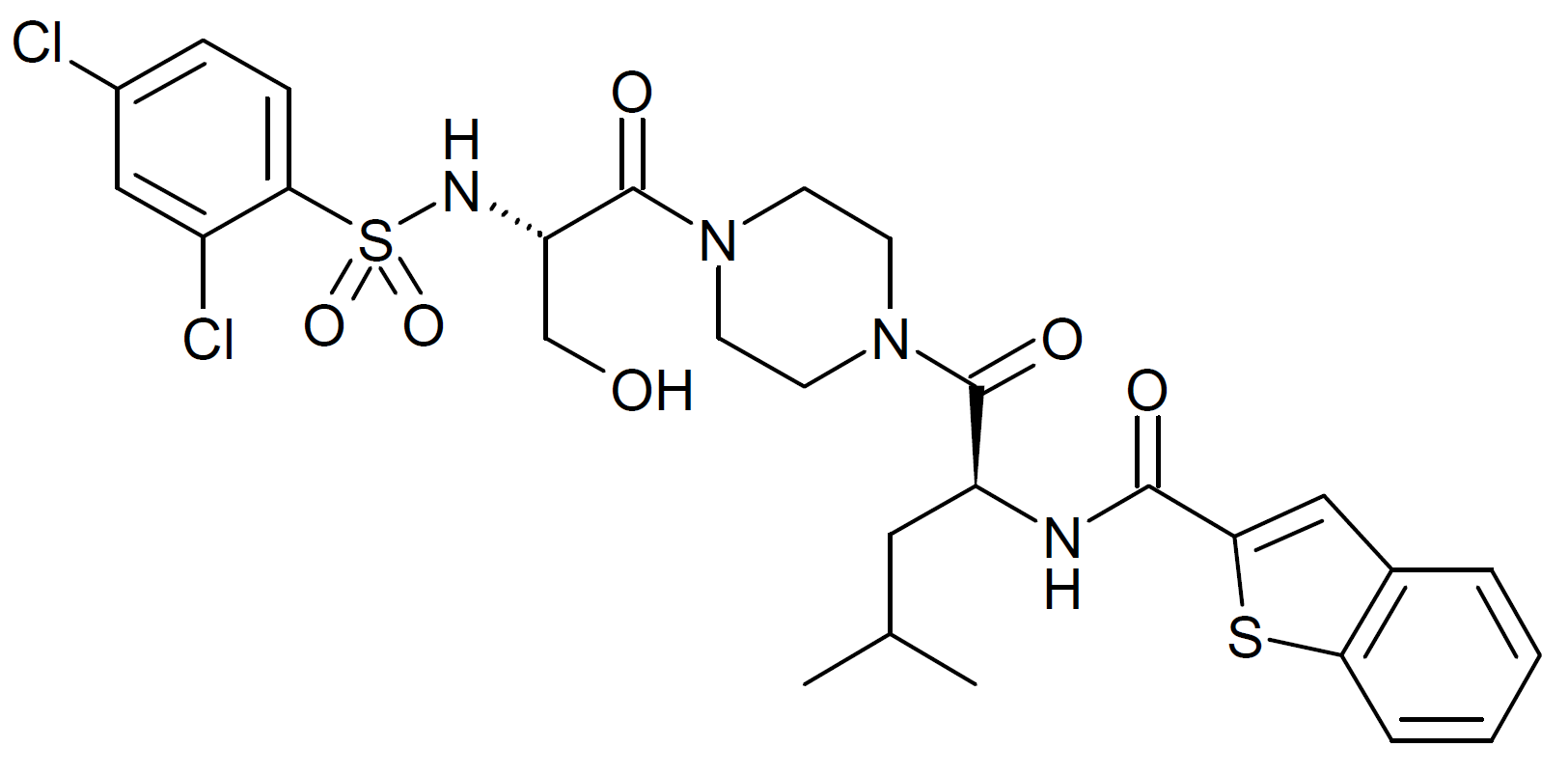

Identifiers
- IUPAC name: N-[(1S)-1-[[4-[(2S)-2-[[(2,4-Dichlorophenyl)sulfonyl]amino]-3-hydroxy-1-oxopropyl]-1-piperazinyl]carbonyl]-3-methylbutyl]benzo[b]thiophene-2-carboxamide
- CAS Number: 942206-85-1
- PubChem CID: 23630211
- ChemSpider: 29310491
- ChEBI: CHEBI:140524
- CompTox Dashboard (EPA): DTXSID30635248

Chemical and physical data
- Formula: C_{28}H_{32}Cl_{2}N_{4}O_{6}S_{2}
- Molar mass: 655.61 g·mol^{−1}
- 3D model (JSmol): Interactive image
- SMILES: CC(C)C[C@H](NC(C1=CC2=CC=CC=C2S1)=O)C(N3CCN(CC3)C([C@H](CO)NS(=O)(C4=C(Cl)C=C(Cl)C=C4)=O)=O)=O
- InChI: InChI=1S/C28H32Cl2N4O6S2/c1-17(2)13-21(31-26(36)24-14-18-5-3-4-6-23(18)41-24)27(37)33-9-11-34(12-10-33)28(38)22(16-35)32-42(39,40)25-8-7-19(29)15-20(25)30/h3-8,14-15,17,21-22,32,35H,9-13,16H2,1-2H3,(H,31,36)/t21-,22-/m0/s1; Key:IVYQPSHHYIAUFO-VXKWHMMOSA-N

GSK1016790A (GSK101) is a drug developed by GlaxoSmithKline which acts as a potent and selective agonist for the TRPV4 receptor. It has been used to study the role of TRPV4 receptors in the function of smooth muscle tissue, particularly that lining blood vessels, lymphatic system, and the bladder.
