= MICU1 =

Protein-coding gene in humans

Identifiers
- Aliases: MICU1, CALC, CBARA1, EFHA3, MPXPS, mitochondrial calcium uptake 1, ara CALC
- External IDs: OMIM: 605084; MGI: 2384909; GeneCards: MICU1
Available structures
PDB	Ortholog search: PDBe RCSB
PDB	List of PDB id codes 4NSC, 4NSD

Gene location (Human)
Chr.	Chromosome 10 (human)
Band	10q22.1	Start	72,367,340 bp
Band	10q22.1	End	72,626,131 bp

Gene location (Mouse)
Chr.	Chromosome 10 (mouse)
Band	10|10 B4	Start	59,538,299 bp
Band	10|10 B4	End	59,699,954 bp
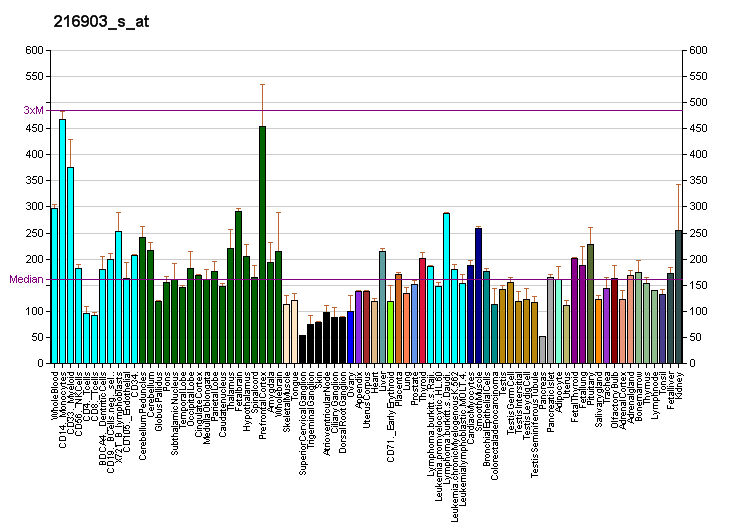
RNA expression pattern
Bgee	Human / Mouse (ortholog); Top expressed in: Achilles tendon; cerebellar hemisphere; right hemisphere of cerebellum; right adrenal cortex; monocyte; left adrenal gland; right frontal lobe; gastrocnemius muscle; left adrenal cortex; prefrontal cortex / Top expressed in: intestinal villus; neural layer of retina; dentate gyrus of hippocampal formation granule cell; granulocyte; pyloric antrum; lens; mucous cell of stomach; zygote; duodenum; muscle of thigh; More reference expression data
BioGPS	More reference expression data
Gene ontology
Molecular function	calcium ion binding; metal ion binding; protein binding; identical protein binding; protein heterodimerization activity
Cellular component	calcium channel complex; membrane; mitochondrial intermembrane space; intracellular anatomical structure; mitochondrion; uniplex complex; integral component of mitochondrial membrane; integral component of membrane; mitochondrial inner membrane
Biological process	defense response; calcium ion import; mitochondrial calcium ion homeostasis; ion transport; calcium import into the mitochondrion; positive regulation of mitochondrial calcium ion concentration; protein homooligomerization; calcium ion transport; mitochondrial calcium ion transmembrane transport; regulation of cellular hyperosmotic salinity response
Sources:Amigo / QuickGO
Orthologs
Databases	NCBI: entry; OMA: entry
Species	Human	Mouse
Entrez	10367	216001
Ensembl	ENSG00000107745	ENSMUSG00000020111
UniProt	Q9BPX6	Q8VCX5
RefSeq (mRNA)	NM_001195518; NM_001195519; NM_006077; NM_001363513	NM_001291442; NM_001291443; NM_144822; NM_001359267
RefSeq (protein)	NP_001182447; NP_001182448; NP_006068; NP_001350442	NP_001278371; NP_001278372; NP_659071; NP_001346196
Location (UCSC)	Chr 10: 72.37 – 72.63 Mb	Chr 10: 59.54 – 59.7 Mb
PubMed search
- Wikidata
View/Edit Human	View/Edit Mouse

Mitochondrial calcium uptake protein 1 is a protein that in humans is encoded by the MICU1 gene (previously CBARA1). This protein functions as a calcium sensor that controls calcium uptake into the mitochondria by interaction with the mitochondrial calcium uniporter (MCU). In particular, it forms a disulfide bridge-bound heterodimer with MICU2 which, depending on the calcium concentration, either promotes or suppresses MCU activity.

== Medical significance ==
Mutations in this gene have been associated with myopathy with extrapyramidal signs.
