= ZINC17988990 =

Chemical compound

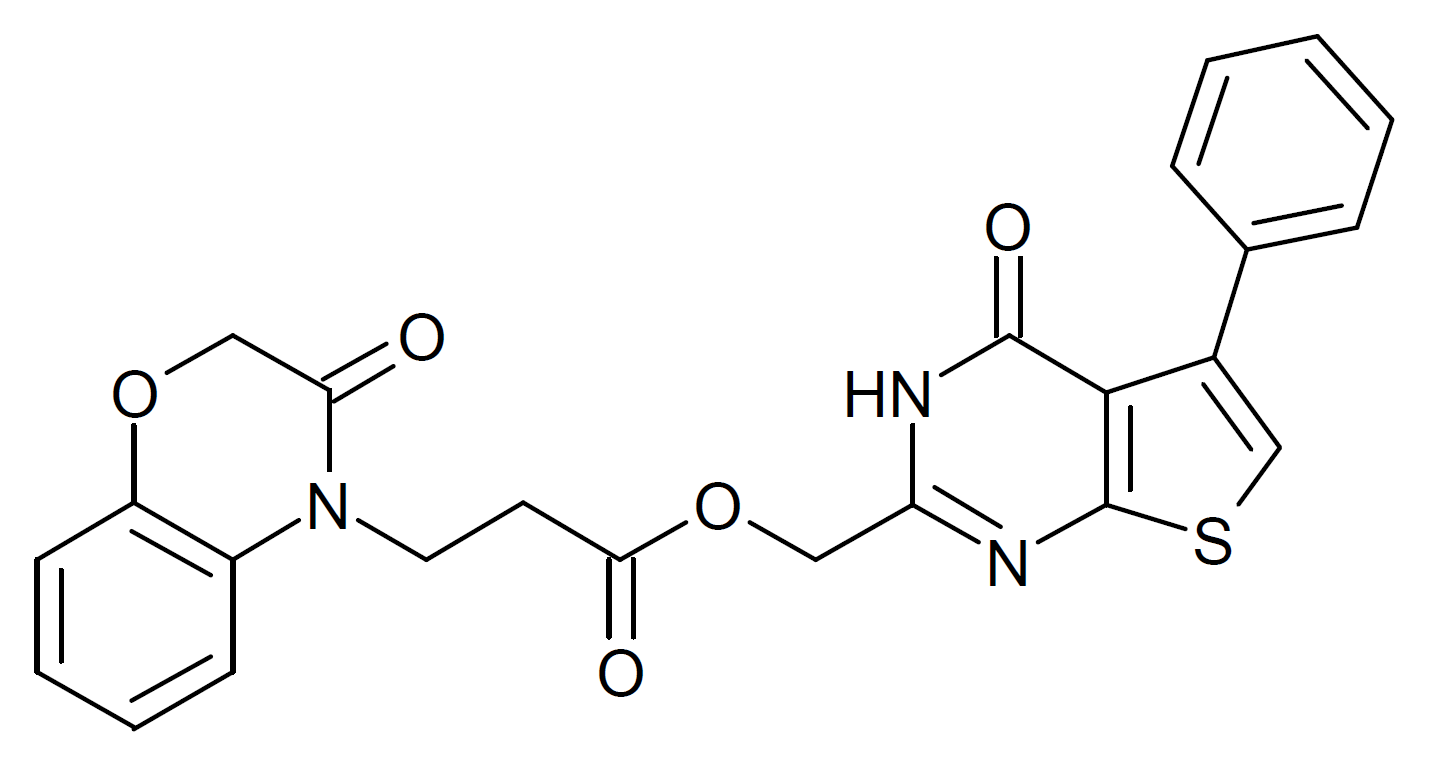

Identifiers
- IUPAC name: (4-oxo-5-phenyl-3H-thieno[2,3-d]pyrimidin-2-yl)methyl 3-(3-oxo-1,4-benzoxazin-4-yl)propanoate
- CAS Number: 1111501-38-2
- PubChem CID: 27791261
- ChemSpider: 22546450
- CompTox Dashboard (EPA): DTXSID101336560

Chemical and physical data
- Formula: C_{24}H_{19}N_{3}O_{5}S
- Molar mass: 461.49 g·mol^{−1}
- 3D model (JSmol): Interactive image
- SMILES: C1C(=O)N(C2=CC=CC=C2O1)CCC(=O)OCC3=NC4=C(C(=CS4)C5=CC=CC=C5)C(=O)N3
- InChI: InChI=1S/C24H19N3O5S/c28-20-13-31-18-9-5-4-8-17(18)27(20)11-10-21(29)32-12-19-25-23(30)22-16(14-33-24(22)26-19)15-6-2-1-3-7-15/h1-9,14H,10-13H2,(H,25,26,30); Key:YOFCRYWWKQMPEW-UHFFFAOYSA-N

ZINC17988990 is a drug which acts as a potent and selective inhibitor for the TRPV5 calcium channel, with an IC_{50} of 177 nM and high selectivity for TRPV5 over TRPV6 and the other subtypes of TRPV. It is the first selective inhibitor to be developed for TRPV5, and may be useful for modulating calcium reabsorption in the kidneys.

== See also ==
- HC-067047
- SET2
