= HC-067047 =

Chemical compound

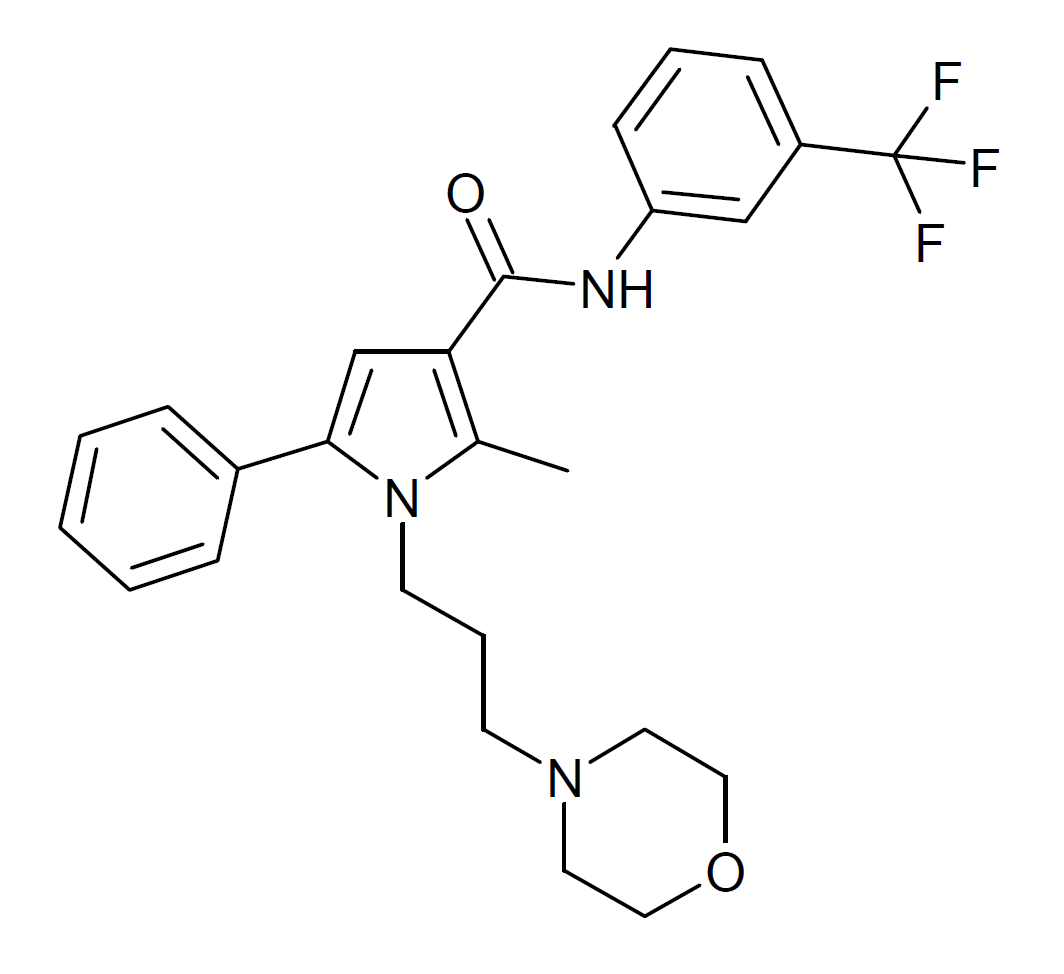

Identifiers
- IUPAC name: 2-methyl-1-(3-morpholin-4-ylpropyl)-5-phenyl-N-[3-(trifluoromethyl)phenyl]pyrrole-3-carboxamide
- CAS Number: 883031-03-6
- PubChem CID: 2742550
- IUPHAR/BPS: 4213
- ChemSpider: 2024081
- ChEMBL: ChEMBL2133556
- CompTox Dashboard (EPA): DTXSID70372463

Chemical and physical data
- Formula: C_{26}H_{28}F_{3}N_{3}O_{2}
- Molar mass: 471.524 g·mol^{−1}
- 3D model (JSmol): Interactive image
- SMILES: CC1=C(C=C(N1CCCN2CCOCC2)C3=CC=CC=C3)C(=O)NC4=CC=CC(=C4)C(F)(F)F
- InChI: InChI=1S/C26H28F3N3O2/c1-19-23(25(33)30-22-10-5-9-21(17-22)26(27,28)29)18-24(20-7-3-2-4-8-20)32(19)12-6-11-31-13-15-34-16-14-31/h2-5,7-10,17-18H,6,11-16H2,1H3,(H,30,33); Key:NCZYSQOTAYFTNM-UHFFFAOYSA-N

HC-067047 is a drug which acts as a potent and selective antagonist for the TRPV4 receptor. It has been used to investigate the role of TRPV4 receptors in a number of areas, such as regulation of blood pressure, bladder function and some forms of pain, as well as neurological functions.

== See also ==
- JWH-147
- RN-9893
- SET2
- ZINC17988990
