= Mitochondrial calcium uniporter =

Protein found in humans

MCU

Identifiers
- Aliases: MCU, C10orf42, CCDC109A, mitochondrial calcium uniporter, HsMCU
- External IDs: OMIM: 614197; MGI: 3026965; GeneCards: MCU
Available structures
PDB	Ortholog search: PDBe RCSB
PDB	List of PDB id codes 4XSJ, 4XTB, 5BZ6

Gene location (Human)
Chr.	Chromosome 10 (human)
Band	10q22.1	Start	72,692,143 bp
Band	10q22.1	End	72,887,694 bp

Gene location (Mouse)
Chr.	Chromosome 10 (mouse)
Band	10|10 B4	Start	59,282,806 bp
Band	10|10 B4	End	59,452,514 bp
RNA expression pattern
Bgee	Human / Mouse (ortholog); Top expressed in: tibialis anterior muscle; mucosa of ileum; rectum; deltoid muscle; muscle of thigh; gastrocnemius muscle; cerebellar hemisphere; mucosa of transverse colon; right hemisphere of cerebellum; epithelium of colon / Top expressed in: zygote; secondary oocyte; transitional epithelium of urinary bladder; hand; granulocyte; foot; ankle; epithelium of small intestine; duodenum; stomach; More reference expression data
BioGPS	n/a
Gene ontology
Molecular function	protein binding; identical protein binding; calcium channel activity; uniporter activity
Cellular component	integral component of membrane; membrane; integral component of mitochondrial inner membrane; uniplex complex; mitochondrion; calcium channel complex; mitochondrial inner membrane
Biological process	glucose homeostasis; ion transport; mitochondrial calcium ion homeostasis; calcium ion transmembrane transport; positive regulation of mitochondrial calcium ion concentration; calcium ion transport; calcium-mediated signaling; positive regulation of insulin secretion; calcium import into the mitochondrion; mitochondrial calcium ion transmembrane transport; protein complex oligomerization
Sources:Amigo / QuickGO
Orthologs
Databases	NCBI: entry; OMA: entry
Species	Human	Mouse
Entrez	90550	215999
Ensembl	ENSG00000156026	ENSMUSG00000009647
UniProt	Q8NE86	Q3UMR5
RefSeq (mRNA)	NM_001270679; NM_001270680; NM_138357	NM_001033259
RefSeq (protein)	NP_001257608; NP_001257609; NP_612366	NP_001028431
Location (UCSC)	Chr 10: 72.69 – 72.89 Mb	Chr 10: 59.28 – 59.45 Mb
PubMed search
- Wikidata
View/Edit Human	View/Edit Mouse

Mitochondrial calcium uniporter

Identifiers
- Symbol: MCU
- Pfam: PF04678
- InterPro: IPR018782
- TCDB: 1.A.77
- OPM superfamily: 486
- OPM protein: 6dnf
- Membranome: 216
Available protein structures:
- PDB: IPR018782 PF04678 (ECOD; PDBsum)
- AlphaFold: IPR018782; PF04678

The mitochondrial calcium uniporter protein (MCU) is a transmembrane protein that in humans is encoded by the gene MCU. It combines with other proteins such as MICU1, MICU2, and SMDT1 (and sometimes others like MICU3 or MCUB) to form the mitochondrial calcium uniporter complex (also called the uniplex complex) that allows the passage of calcium ions from a cell's cytosol into the mitochondria. The MCU protein functions as the channel-forming subunit, while the other proteins act as calcium sensors or other types of regulatory subunits.

The MCU is one of the primary sources of mitochondria uptake of calcium, and flow is dependent on membrane potential of the inner mitochondrial membrane and the concentration of calcium in the cytosol relative to the concentration in the mitochondria. Balancing calcium concentration is necessary to increase the cell's energy supply and regulate cell death. Calcium is balanced through the MCU in conjunction with the sodium-calcium exchanger.

The MCU has a very low affinity for calcium, so the cytosolic calcium concentration needs to be approximately 5-10 uM for significant transport of calcium into the mitochondria. Mitochondria are closely associated with the endoplasmic reticulum (ER), at contact sites, which contains stores of cellular calcium ions for calcium signaling. The presence of inositol 1,4,5-triphosphate (IP_{3}) triggers the release of calcium from these intracellular stores, which creates microdomains of high calcium concentration between the ER and the mitochondria, creating the conditions for the MCU to take up calcium.

Ruthenium red and Ru360 are typical reagents used to experimentally block the MCU to study its properties and role in mitochondrial signaling.

== Calcium sensing subunits ==
=== MICU1 ===
Mitochondrial calcium uptake 1

Identifiers
- Symbol: MICU1
- Alt. symbols: CBARA1
- NCBI gene: 10367
- HGNC: 1530
- OMIM: 605084
- RefSeq: NM_006077
- UniProt: Q9BPX6

Other data
- Locus: Chr. 10 q22.1
Search for
- Structures: Swiss-model
- Domains: InterPro

Mitochondrial calcium uptake 2

Identifiers
- Symbol: MICU2
- Alt. symbols: EFHA1
- NCBI gene: 221154
- HGNC: 31830
- OMIM: 610632
- RefSeq: NM_152726
- UniProt: Q8IYU8

Other data
- Locus: Chr. 13 q12.11
Search for
- Structures: Swiss-model
- Domains: InterPro

Mitochondrial calcium uptake 3

Identifiers
- Symbol: MICU3
- Alt. symbols: EFHA2
- NCBI gene: 286097
- HGNC: 27820
- OMIM: 610633
- RefSeq: NM_181723
- UniProt: Q86XE3

Other data
- Locus: Chr. 8 p22
Search for
- Structures: Swiss-model
- Domains: InterPro

The mitochondrial calcium uptake 1 (MICU1) is a single pass membrane protein, it contains 2 binding domains. This protein was first discovered before the MCU by only a few months. MICU1 was used as a bait to figure out what the core of the mitochondrial calcium uniporter was. Once both MICU1 and MCU were discovered scientists made some intriguing discoveries in regards to the two proteins. Both MICU1 and MCU share similar RNA sequences, same pattern of expression, and they both interact with one another in the intermitochondrial membrane. It was first found through the use of siRNA screening of the membrane. The functions of MICU1 are still being studied; however, there are some important functions MICU1 plays in the intermitochondrial membrane. MICU1 helps to stabilize the entire mitochondrial calcium uniporter complex, it also limits the amount of calcium that enters the cell during low concentrations of calcium. However, along with limiting the entry of calcium into the mitochondrial matrix, it functions alongside MCU to keep the accumulated calcium inside the matrix of the mitochondria, and promotes ion specificity by preventing aberrant loading of transition metals into the mitochondria.

=== MICU2 ===
Mitochondrial calcium uptake 2 (MICU2) is another intermitochondrial membrane protein. It works alongside MICU1 and contains roughly 25% of the same DNA sequence. MICU2 works with MICU1 and MCU to reduce the amount of calcium coming into the matrix. It is shown that when both MICU1 and MICU2 are sequestered there is reduced calcium; however, whenever MICU1 is sequestered and MICU2 is activated, normal calcium flow. It is also shown that all three, MCU, MICU1, and MICU2 are part of a single complex, the mitochondrial calcium uniporter complex resumes. Research using a CRISPR/Cas9 technique has found that MICU1 and MICU2 play other roles as well. They are essential for cell growth, cell invasion, and cell replication.

=== MICU3 ===
Mitochondrial calcium uptake protein 3 is an alternative calcium-sensing subunit that in humans is encoded by the gene MICU3. Expressed in the central nervous system and skeletal muscles, MICU3 can replace MICU2 in the MCU complex. Like MICU2, it binds to MICU1, though it has a higher calcium affinity.

== Other regulatory subunits ==
Essential MCU regulator, mitochondrial

Identifiers
- Symbol: SMDT1
- Alt. symbols: C22orf32
- Alt. names: Single-pass membrane protein with aspartate rich tail 1
- NCBI gene: 91689
- HGNC: 25055
- OMIM: 615588
- RefSeq: NM_033318
- UniProt: Q9H4I9

Other data
- Locus: Chr. 22 q13.2
Search for
- Structures: Swiss-model
- Domains: InterPro

Calcium uniporter regulatory subunit MCUb, mitochondrial

Identifiers
- Symbol: MCUB
- Alt. symbols: CCDC109B
- Alt. names: Mitochondrial calcium uniporter dominant negative subunit beta
- NCBI gene: 55013
- HGNC: 26076
- OMIM: 620702
- RefSeq: NM_017918
- UniProt: Q9NWR8

Other data
- Locus: Chr. 4 q25
Search for
- Structures: Swiss-model
- Domains: InterPro
