= Ensconsin =

Protein-coding gene in the species Homo sapiens

MAP7

Identifiers
- Aliases: MAP7, E-MAP-115, EMAP115, microtubule associated protein 7
- External IDs: OMIM: 604108; MGI: 1328328; GeneCards: MAP7

Gene location (Human)
Chr.	Chromosome 6 (human)
Band	6q23.3	Start	136,342,281 bp
Band	6q23.3	End	136,550,819 bp

Gene location (Mouse)
Chr.	Chromosome 10 (mouse)
Band	10 A3|10 9.75 cM	Start	20,024,217 bp
Band	10 A3|10 9.75 cM	End	20,157,336 bp
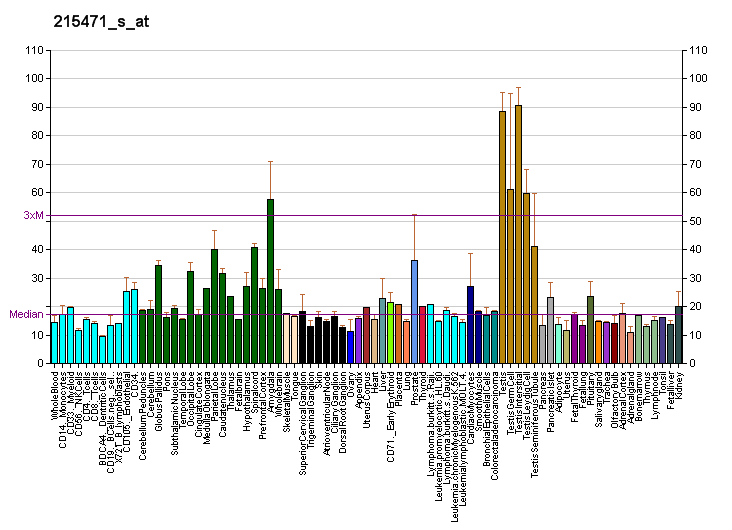

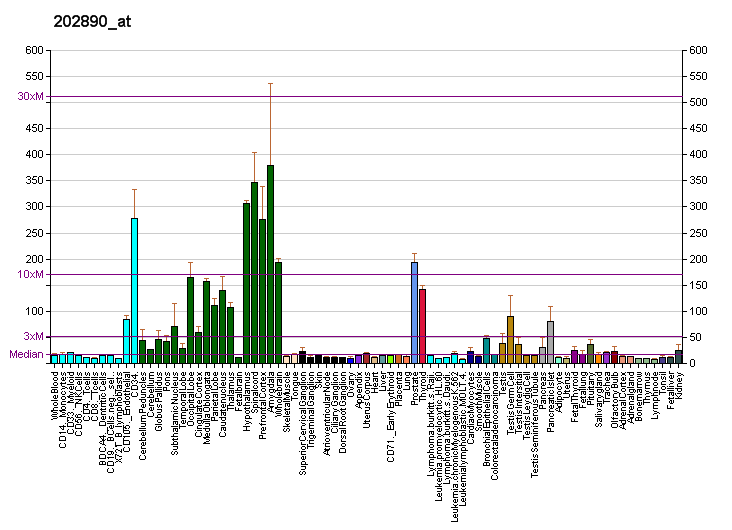

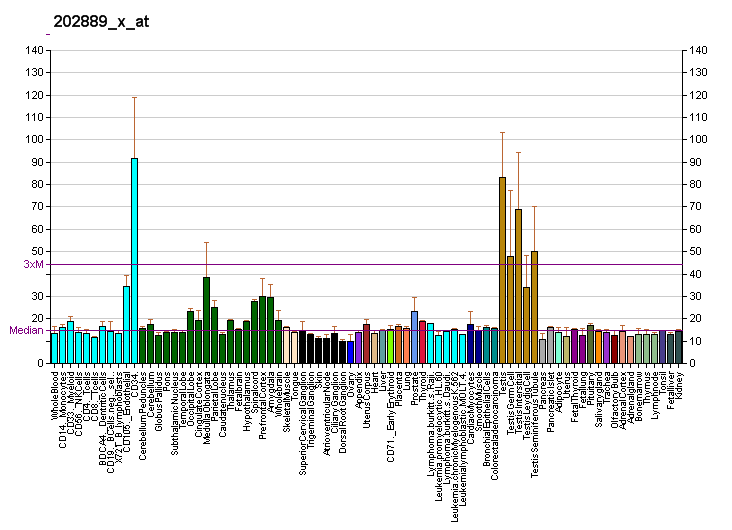
RNA expression pattern
Bgee	Human / Mouse (ortholog); Top expressed in: endothelial cell; inferior ganglion of vagus nerve; hair follicle; inferior olivary nucleus; optic nerve; subthalamic nucleus; kidney tubule; Brodmann area 23; mucosa of sigmoid colon; jejunal mucosa / Top expressed in: neural layer of retina; epithelium of lens; submandibular gland; crypt of lieberkuhn of small intestine; retinal pigment epithelium; globus pallidus; Paneth cell; deep cerebellar nuclei; left colon; pineal gland; More reference expression data
BioGPS	More reference expression data
Gene ontology
Molecular function	signaling receptor binding; structural molecule activity; protein binding
Cellular component	perinuclear region of cytoplasm; plasma membrane; basolateral plasma membrane; microtubule; cytoskeleton; membrane; microtubule associated complex; microtubule cytoskeleton; cytoplasm; cytosol; axon
Biological process	response to osmotic stress; establishment or maintenance of cell polarity; protein localization to plasma membrane; microtubule cytoskeleton organization
Sources:Amigo / QuickGO
Orthologs
Databases	NCBI: entry; OMA: entry
Species	Human	Mouse
Entrez	9053	17761
Ensembl	ENSG00000135525	ENSMUSG00000019996
UniProt	Q14244	O88735
RefSeq (mRNA)	NM_001198608; NM_001198609; NM_001198611; NM_001198614; NM_001198615 NM_001198616; NM_001198617; NM_001198618; NM_001198619; NM_003980	NM_001198635; NM_001198636; NM_008635; NM_001358787
RefSeq (protein)	NP_001185537; NP_001185538; NP_001185540; NP_001185543; NP_001185544 NP_001185545; NP_001185546; NP_001185547; NP_001185548; NP_003971	NP_001185564; NP_032661; NP_001345716
Location (UCSC)	Chr 6: 136.34 – 136.55 Mb	Chr 10: 20.02 – 20.16 Mb
PubMed search
- Wikidata
View/Edit Human	View/Edit Mouse

Ensconsin is a protein that in humans is encoded by the MAP7 gene.

== Function ==
The product of this gene is a microtubule-associated protein that is predominantly expressed in cells of epithelial origin. Microtubule-associated proteins are thought to be involved in microtubule dynamics, which is essential for cell polarization and differentiation. This protein has been shown to be able to stabilize microtubules, and may serve to modulate microtubule functions. Studies of the related mouse protein also suggested an essential role in microtubule function required for spermatogenesis.

In addition, MAPs also play a role in regulating cellular transport. MAP7 is a necessary cofactor to activate and subsequently transport cargos by Kinesin-1.

MAP7's effect on Dynein is still debated.

== Interactions ==
MAP7 has been shown to interact with TRPV4.
