= TRPV4 =

Protein-coding gene in humans

Identifiers
- Aliases: TRPV4, BCYM3, CMT2C, HMSN2C, OTRPC4, SMAL, SPSMA, SSQTL1, TRP12, VRL2, VROAC, transient receptor potential cation channel subfamily V member 4
- External IDs: OMIM: 605427; MGI: 1926945; GeneCards: TRPV4
Available structures
PDB	Ortholog search: PDBe RCSB
PDB	List of PDB id codes 4DX1, 4DX2

Gene location (Human)
Chr.	Chromosome 12 (human)
Band	12q24.11	Start	109,783,087 bp
Band	12q24.11	End	109,833,406 bp

Gene location (Mouse)
Chr.	Chromosome 5 (mouse)
Band	5|5 F	Start	114,760,213 bp
Band	5|5 F	End	114,796,482 bp
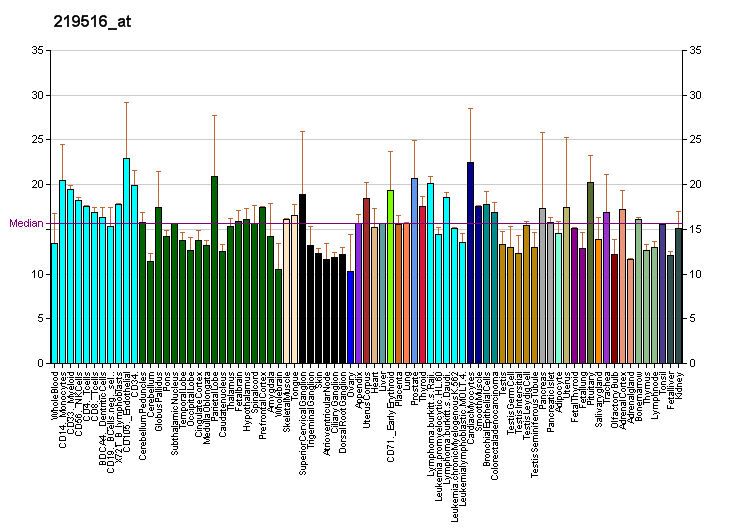
RNA expression pattern
Bgee	Human / Mouse (ortholog); Top expressed in: cartilage tissue; olfactory zone of nasal mucosa; minor salivary glands; stromal cell of endometrium; oocyte; testicle; human kidney; tibia; bronchial epithelial cell; skin of abdomen / Top expressed in: right kidney; intervertebral disk of lumbar vertebra; proximal tubule; intervertebral disk of cervical vertebra; intervertebral disk of thoracic vertebra; Epithelium of choroid plexus; human kidney; stroma of bone marrow; Dermatocranium; facial skeleton; More reference expression data
BioGPS	More reference expression data
Gene ontology
Molecular function	nucleotide binding; stretch-activated, cation-selective, calcium channel activity; osmosensor activity; microtubule binding; alpha-tubulin binding; SH2 domain binding; calmodulin binding; actin filament binding; ion channel activity; protein binding; beta-tubulin binding; cation channel activity; actin binding; ATP binding; protein kinase binding; protein kinase C binding; calcium channel activity; lipid binding; identical protein binding; metal ion binding
Cellular component	integral component of membrane; cell projection; membrane; focal adhesion; filopodium; growth cone; adherens junction; plasma membrane; ruffle membrane; cell surface; cell junction; apical plasma membrane; cortical actin cytoskeleton; cytoplasmic microtubule; cytoplasmic vesicle; lamellipodium; integral component of plasma membrane; cilium; endoplasmic reticulum
Biological process	actin cytoskeleton reorganization; cell volume homeostasis; cellular response to heat; positive regulation of inflammatory response; negative regulation of neuron projection development; glucose homeostasis; cellular hypotonic salinity response; positive regulation of chemokine (C-X-C motif) ligand 1 production; positive regulation of cytosolic calcium ion concentration; calcium ion import; positive regulation of monocyte chemotactic protein-1 production; response to mechanical stimulus; negative regulation of brown fat cell differentiation; osmosensory signaling pathway; cellular calcium ion homeostasis; hyperosmotic salinity response; microtubule polymerization; negative regulation of transcription by RNA polymerase II; positive regulation of JNK cascade; cellular hypotonic response; ion transport; vasopressin secretion; cellular response to osmotic stress; regulation of response to osmotic stress; diet induced thermogenesis; response to osmotic stress; response to insulin; positive regulation of gene expression; positive regulation of vascular permeability; calcium ion transmembrane transport; cortical microtubule organization; positive regulation of chemokine (C-C motif) ligand 5 production; cell-cell junction assembly; positive regulation of ERK1 and ERK2 cascade; hypotonic response; positive regulation of macrophage inflammatory protein 1 alpha production; blood vessel endothelial cell delamination; multicellular organismal water homeostasis; positive regulation of macrophage chemotaxis; calcium ion transport; positive regulation of microtubule depolymerization; actin filament organization; transmembrane transport; cartilage development involved in endochondral bone morphogenesis; energy homeostasis
Sources:Amigo / QuickGO
Orthologs
Databases	NCBI: entry; OMA: entry
Species	Human	Mouse
Entrez	59341	63873
Ensembl	ENSG00000111199	ENSMUSG00000014158
UniProt	Q9HBA0	Q9EPK8
RefSeq (mRNA)	NM_001177428; NM_001177431; NM_001177433; NM_021625; NM_147204	NM_022017
RefSeq (protein)	NP_001170899; NP_001170902; NP_001170904; NP_067638; NP_671737	NP_071300
Location (UCSC)	Chr 12: 109.78 – 109.83 Mb	Chr 5: 114.76 – 114.8 Mb
PubMed search
- Wikidata
View/Edit Human	View/Edit Mouse

Transient receptor potential cation channel subfamily V member 4 is an ion channel protein that in humans is encoded by the TRPV4 gene.

The TRPV4 gene encodes TRPV4, initially named "vanilloid-receptor related osmotically activated channel" (VR-OAC) and "OSM9-like transient receptor potential channel, member 4 (OTRPC4)", a member of the vanilloid subfamily in the transient receptor potential (TRP) superfamily of ion channels. The encoded protein is a Ca^{2+}-permeable, nonselective cation channel that has been found involved in multiple physiologic functions, dysfunctions and also disease. It functions in the regulation of systemic osmotic pressure by the brain, in vascular function, in liver, intestinal, renal and bladder function, in skin barrier function and response of the skin to ultraviolet-B radiation, in growth and structural integrity of the skeleton, in function of joints, in airway- and lung function, in retinal and inner ear function, and in pain. The channel is activated by osmotic, mechanical and chemical cues. It also responds to thermal changes (warmth). Channel activation can be sensitized by inflammation and injury.

The TRPV4 gene has been co-discovered by W. Liedtke et al. and R. Strotmann et al.

== Clinical significance ==
Channelopathy mutations in the TRPV4 gene lead to skeletal dysplasias, premature osteoarthritis, and neurological motor function disorders and are associated with a range of disorders, including brachyolmia type 3, congenital distal spinal muscular atrophy, Familial digital arthropathy-brachydactyly (FDAB), scapuloperoneal spinal muscular atrophy, and subtype 2C of Charcot–Marie–Tooth disease.

== Pharmacology ==
A number of TRPV4 agonists and antagonists have been identified since its discovery. The discovery of unselective modulators (e.g. antagonist ruthenium red) was followed by the apparition of more potent (agonist 4aPDD) or selective (antagonist RN-1734) compounds, including some with bioavailability suitable for in vivo pharmacology studies such as agonist GSK1016790A (with ~10 fold selectivity vs TRPV1), and antagonists HC-067047 (with ~5 fold selectivity vs hERG and ~10 fold selectivity vs TRPM8) and RN-9893 (with ~50 fold selectivity vs TRPM8 and ~10 fold selectivity vs M1).

Resolvin D1 (RvD1), a metabolite of the omega 3 fatty acid, docosahexaenoic acid, is a member of the specialized proresolving mediators (SPMs) class of metabolites that function to resolve diverse inflammatory reactions and diseases in animal models and, it is proposed, humans. This SPM also dampens pain perception arising from various inflammation-based causes in animal models. The mechanism behind this pain-dampening effect involves the inhibition of TRPV4, probably (in at least certain cases) by an indirect effect wherein it activates another receptor located on neurons or nearby microglia or astrocytes. CMKLR1, GPR32, FPR2, and NMDA receptors have been proposed to be the receptors through which a SPM may operate to down-regulate TRPs and thereby pain perception.

== Interactions ==
TRPV4 has been shown to interact with MAP7 and LYN.

== Implication in Temperature-Dependent Sex Determination in Reptiles ==
TRPV4 has been proposed to be the thermal sensor in gonads of Alligator mississipiensis, a species with temperature-dependent sex determination. However the data were over interpreted and TRPV4 is probably not involved in temperature-dependent sex determination due to large overlap of expression at male producing temperature and female producing temperature for example.

== See also ==
- TRPV
