= MCUB =

Protein-coding gene found in humans

Identifiers
- Aliases: MCUB, EMRE, MCUb, CCDC109B, Ccdc109b, coiled-coil domain containing 109B, mitochondrial calcium uniporter dominant negative beta subunit, mitochondrial calcium uniporter dominant negative subunit beta
- External IDs: MGI: 1914065; GeneCards: MCUB

Gene location (Human)
Chr.	Chromosome 4 (human)
Band	4q25	Start	109,560,209 bp
Band	4q25	End	109,688,719 bp

Gene location (Mouse)
Chr.	Chromosome 3 (mouse)
Band	3|3 G3	Start	129,708,609 bp
Band	3|3 G3	End	129,763,855 bp
RNA expression pattern
Bgee	Human / Mouse (ortholog); Top expressed in: monocyte; germinal epithelium; secondary oocyte; palpebral conjunctiva; granulocyte; lymph node; appendix; gingival epithelium; blood; Achilles tendon / Top expressed in: lumbar spinal ganglion; endothelial cell of lymphatic vessel; primary oocyte; pituitary gland; secondary oocyte; stroma of bone marrow; trigeminal ganglion; calvaria; habenula; thymus; More reference expression data
BioGPS	n/a
Gene ontology
Molecular function	uniporter activity; ion channel activity; calcium channel inhibitor activity; calcium channel activity
Cellular component	membrane; integral component of membrane; intrinsic component of membrane; calcium channel complex; mitochondrion; integral component of mitochondrial inner membrane; uniplex complex; mitochondrial inner membrane
Biological process	mitochondrial calcium ion homeostasis; ion transport; calcium import into the mitochondrion; calcium ion transport; mitochondrial calcium ion transmembrane transport
Sources:Amigo / QuickGO
Orthologs
Databases	NCBI: entry; OMA: entry
Species	Human	Mouse
Entrez	55013	66815
Ensembl	ENSG00000005059	ENSMUSG00000027994
UniProt	Q9NWR8	Q810S1
RefSeq (mRNA)	NM_017918	NM_001293644; NM_025779
RefSeq (protein)	NP_060388	NP_001280573; NP_080055
Location (UCSC)	Chr 4: 109.56 – 109.69 Mb	Chr 3: 129.71 – 129.76 Mb
PubMed search
- Wikidata
View/Edit Human	View/Edit Mouse

Calcium uniporter regulatory subunit MCUb, mitochondrial is a protein that in humans is encoded by the gene MCUB. As its name suggests, this protein is a regulatory subunit of the mitochondrial calcium uniporter complex. In particular, MCUB functions to reduce calcium uptake by the mitochondria during stress.

== Gene information ==
CCDC109B is located at 4q25 and is 128,520 base pairs in length. CCDC109B contains eight exons and is located on the positive strand of chromosome four. CCDC109B has nine transcript variants due to alternative splicing. The unspliced version of this gene is the longest and most common variant found in human cells and is 1298 base pairs in length.

Location of CCDC109B gene on Chromosome 4.

== Protein information ==
When translated, the CCDC109B protein is composed of 336 amino acids and has a molecular weight of 39.1 kDa. The 3' end of this protein is highly conserved and contains domains crucial for protein function.

=== Protein domains ===
- Domain of Unknown Function 607 (DUF607): The function of this domain is largely unknown, although it may serve as a calcium transporter when CCDC109B forms homo-oligomers. DUF607 is conserved in orthologs and is located closer to the 3' end of this protein, even though DUF607 is present for most of the protein's length.

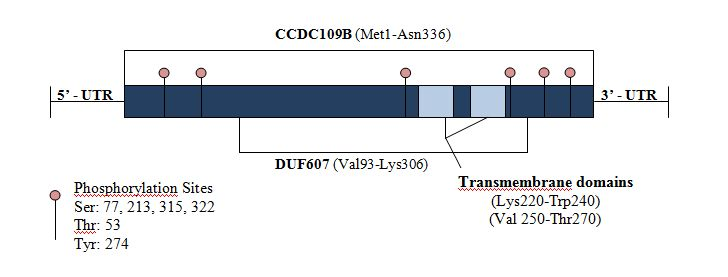
Overview of the major domains present in CCDC109B.

- Transmembrane Region: CCDC109B contains two transmembrane regions, located within DUF607, making it a multipass membrane protein. Since there are two transmembrane regions, both the N-terminus and C-terminus are located on one side of the membrane and have been localized to the cytosolic side of the cell membrane.

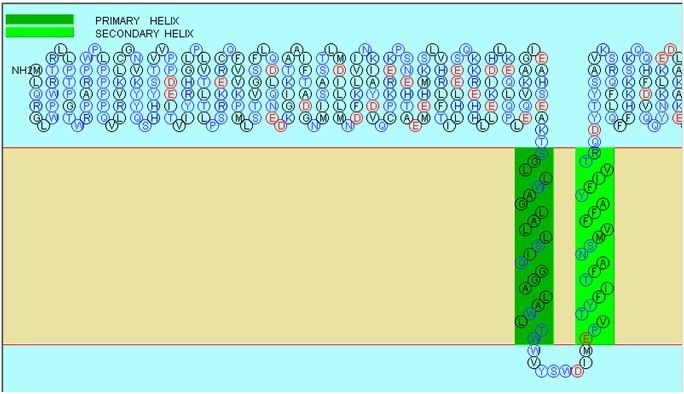
General view of CCDC109B as a transmembrane protein. The top of the image shows the cytosolic end of the protein. The bottom of the image shows the DIME Motif which is completely conserved in all organisms that have either CCDC109B or its paralog, MCU

- DIME Motif: This motif is a completely conserved region found in all orthologs of this protein and is found within DUF607 and between the transmembrane domains. The DIME motif is a sequence of 23 amino acids that has the sequence: QxGxLAxLTWWxYSWDIMEPVTYF, where letters correspond to actual amino acid residue and "x" represents amino acids that are not conserved within this sequence. Throughout the entire CCDC109B protein there are no other conserved amino acid sequences that are greater than three amino acids in length. The DIME Motif has a hypothesized role in calcium transport and is most likely essential in DUF607.

=== Post-translational modifications ===
==== Phosphorylation sites ====
The CCDC109B protein contains several likely phosphorylation sites on serine, threonine, and tyrosine residues.

- Serine Phosphorylation Sites: Amino acid positions 77, 213, 315, and 322.
- Threonine Phosphorylation Site: Amino acid position 53.
- Tyrosine Phosphorylation Site: Amino acid position 274.

==== Sumoylation site ====
There is one likely sumoylation site within CCDC109B at amino acid residue 306, which is a lysine. This residue is highly conserved among orthologs.

=== Tertiary structure ===
Although it is known that CCDC109B is a transmembrane protein the proper folding of its N-terminus and C-terminus is unclear.

== Homology ==
CCDC109B shows conservation in vertebrates, including mammals, birds, reptiles, and amphibians. There appears to be some conservation in earlier organisms such as flies, worms, and plants, but the percent identity is very low and these organisms have many orthologous structures that may not be CCDC109B. The orthologs found in non-vertebrate organisms may also actually be the paralog of CCDC109B which is still producing some identity to CCDC109B.

The table below shows CCDC109B conservation among vertebrate organisms:

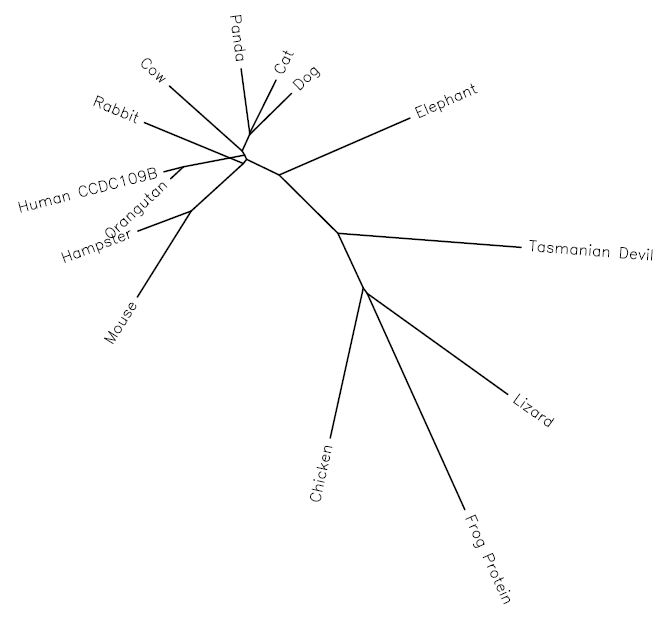
Phylogenetic Tree of CCDC109B Orthologs. Length between organisms is related to how closely related they are. Shorter length correlates to more conservation.

Genus Species	Organism Common Name	Divergence from Humans (MYA)	NCBI Protein Accession	Sequence Similarity	Protein Length
Homo sapiens	Humans	--	NP_060388.2	100%	336
Pongo abelii	Orangutan	15.7	XP_002815099	96%	336
Ailuropoda melanoleuca	Panda	94.2	XP_002929388.1	86%	469
Felis catus	Domestic Cat	94.2	XP_003985143.1	86%	333
Oryctolagus cuniculus	Rabbit	92.3	XP_002717237.1	83%	325
Canis lupus familiaris	Domestic Dog	94.2	XP_535692.2	82%	337
Bos taurus	Cow	94.1	NP_001068639.1	81%	335
Cricetulus griseus	Hamster	92.3	XP_003512344.1	79%	348
Mus musculus	Mouse	92.3	NP_080055.2	74%	345
Loxodonta africana	Elephant	98.7	XP_003410529.1	74%	428
Gallus gallus	Chicken	296	XP_420651.3	63%	345
Anolis carolinensis	Lizard	296	XP_003221841.1	59%	319
Sarcophilus harrisii	Tasmanian Devil	162.6	XP_003772954.1	59%	342
Xenopus laevis	Frog	371.2	NP_001087837.1	55%	319

=== Paralog of CCDC109B ===
CCDC109B has a single paralog in the human genome. This paralog is CCDC109A, which is more commonly known as Mitochondrial Calcium Uniporter (MCU) MCU is located in the inner membrane of the mitochondrion and is found as an oligomer that transports calcium ions into the mitochondria. MCU is an essential component of the mitochondrial membrane and silencing MCU abolishes calcium uptake. The DIME motif, which is also conserved in CCDC109B, is responsible for calcium uptake and a mutation in this region inhibits this function. CCDC109B and MCU share a 43% identity in which the DIME motif is fully conserved.

== Expression profile ==
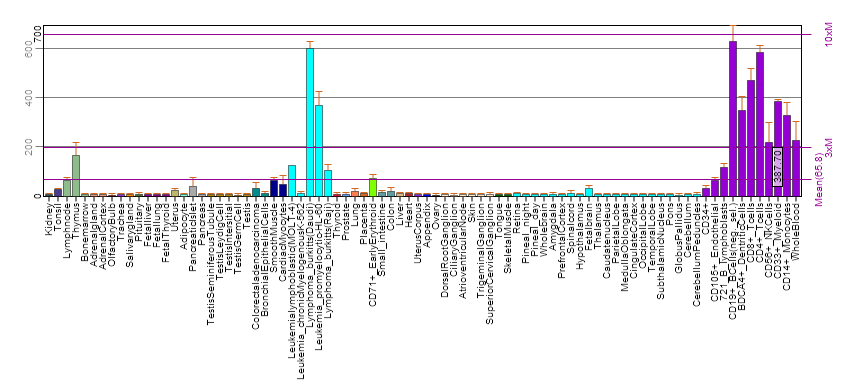
Expression pattern of CCDC109B. CCDC109B is expressed at high levels in the immune system and also in various blood disorders.

CCDC109B is expressed at high levels in the immune system and the circulatory system. CCDC109B is expressed in B-cells, Dendritic Cells, T-Cells, and Natural Killer Cells. CCDC109B expression is not present in human adipose tissue, adrenal glands, bladder, bone marrow, ear, esophagus, larynx, parathyroid, pituitary gland, spleen, thyroid, trachea, or umbilical cord tissues.

=== Role in disease ===
CCDC109B may contribute to a number of diseases including various lymphomas and leukemias. Changes in CCDC109B expression are also present in other diseases such as glioblastomas, Daudi Burkitt's lymphoma, Duchenne muscular dystrophy, breast carcinomas, and promyelocytic leukemia HL-60. CCDC109B may also contribute to atopic dermatitis skin lesions and Job's Syndrome. However, the mechanisms behind the role of CCDC109B in these diseases are unclear and not well characterized through research.

== Protein-protein interaction ==
=== Transcription factors ===
CCDC109B has a promoter region that contains sites for transcription factor binding. This promoter region is approximately 500 nucleotides long and is located just prior to the start of translation. Notable transcription factors that bind CCDC109B include:

- Fork Head Domain Factors (FKHD)
- Myeloid Zinc Finger 1 Factors (MZF1)
- Pleomorphic Adenoma Gene (PLAG)
- Cys_{2}His_{2} Zinc Finger Transcription Factors 2 (ZF02)
- Vertebrate SMAD Family of Transcription Factors (SMAD)
- Twist Subfamily of Class B bHLH Transcription Factors (HAND)
- CCAAT/Enhance Binding Protein (CEBP)
- Nuclear Factor of Activated T-Cells (NFAT)

=== Cellular proteins ===
CCDC109B interacts with ZBTB16, which is a zinc-finger transcription factor and has a probable role in protein degradation. CCDC109B's interaction with ZBTB16 was determined by a yeast two-hybrid screen It is still unclear how CCDC109B interacts with ZBTB16.

Other proteins that CCDC109B interact with are currently unknown.
