= CALHM1 =

Protein-coding gene in humans

Identifiers
- Aliases: CALHM1, FAM26C, calcium homeostasis modulator 1
- External IDs: OMIM: 612234; MGI: 3643383; GeneCards: CALHM1

Gene location (Human)
Chr.	Chromosome 10 (human)
Band	10q24.33	Start	103,453,240 bp
Band	10q24.33	End	103,458,900 bp

Gene location (Mouse)
Chr.	Chromosome 19 (mouse)
Band	19|19 C3	Start	47,129,348 bp
Band	19|19 C3	End	47,132,693 bp
RNA expression pattern
Bgee	Human / Mouse (ortholog); Top expressed in: endothelial cell; prefrontal cortex; external globus pallidus; pars compacta; superior vestibular nucleus; Brodmann area 9; right frontal lobe; occipital lobe; Brodmann area 23; superior frontal gyrus / n/a; More reference expression data
BioGPS	n/a
Gene ontology
Molecular function	voltage-gated calcium channel activity; calcium activated cation channel activity; calcium channel activity; voltage-gated ion channel activity; identical protein binding
Cellular component	integral component of membrane; endoplasmic reticulum membrane; membrane; plasma membrane; integral component of plasma membrane; endoplasmic reticulum
Biological process	sensory perception of umami taste; ATP transport; regulation of ion transmembrane transport; cation transport; ion transport; sensory perception of bitter taste; calcium ion transmembrane transport; sensory perception of sweet taste; protein homooligomerization; sensory perception of taste; calcium ion transport
Sources:Amigo / QuickGO
Orthologs
Databases	NCBI: entry; OMA: entry
Species	Human	Mouse
Entrez	255022	546729
Ensembl	ENSG00000185933	ENSMUSG00000079258
UniProt	Q8IU99	D3Z291
RefSeq (mRNA)	NM_001001412	NM_001081271
RefSeq (protein)	NP_001001412	NP_001074740
Location (UCSC)	Chr 10: 103.45 – 103.46 Mb	Chr 19: 47.13 – 47.13 Mb
PubMed search
- Wikidata
View/Edit Human	View/Edit Mouse

Calcium homeostasis modulator 1 (CALHM1) is a pore-forming subunit of a voltage-gated ion channel and a voltage-gated ATP channel that in humans is encoded by the CALHM1 gene.

== Function ==
=== Central nervous system ===
CALHM1 was identified by a tissue-specific gene expression profiling approach that screened for genes located on susceptibility loci for late-onset Alzheimer's disease (AD) and that are preferentially expressed in the hippocampus, a brain region affected early in AD. CALHM1 is a plasma membrane calcium-permeable ion channel regulated by voltage and extracellular calcium levels. The exact function of CALHM1 in the brain is not completely understood, but studies have shown that CALHM1 controls neuronal intracellular calcium homeostasis and signaling, as well as calcium-dependent neuronal excitability and memory in mouse models. Recent data have also shown that CALHM1 might facilitate the proteolytic degradation of the cerebral amyloid beta peptide, a culprit in AD pathogenesis.

=== Peripheral taste system ===
CALHM1 is expressed in taste bud cells where it controls purinergic receptor-mediated taste transduction in the gustatory system.

== See also ==
- Ruthenium red
