= SET2 =

Chemical compound

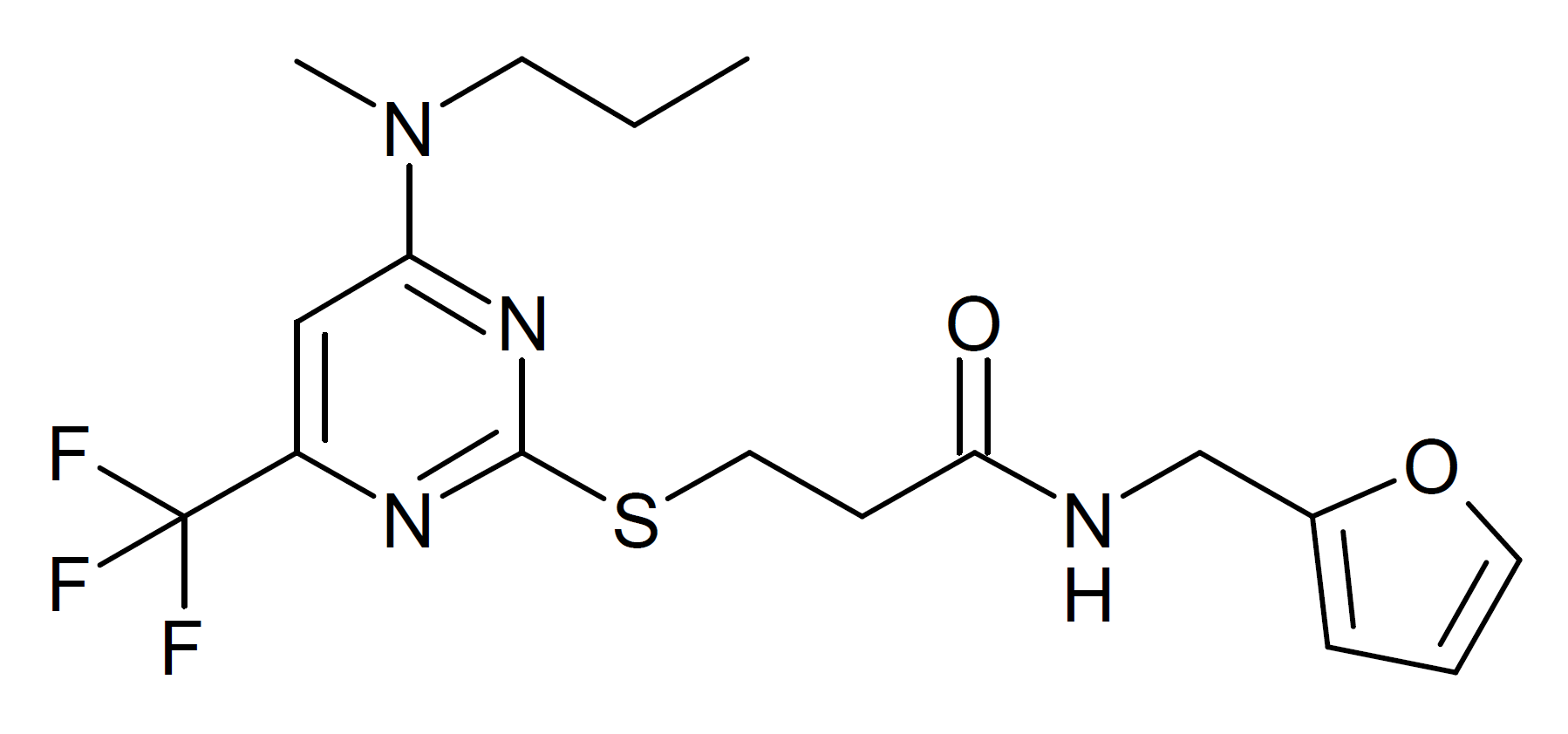

Identifiers
- IUPAC name: N-(furan-2-ylmethyl)-3-({4-[methyl(propyl)amino]-6-(trifluoromethyl)pyrimidin-2-yl}sulfanyl)propanamide
- CAS Number: 2313525-20-9
- PubChem CID: 155541857
- ChemSpider: 88296672
- ChEMBL: ChEMBL4519204
- CompTox Dashboard (EPA): DTXSID101336558

Chemical and physical data
- Formula: C_{17}H_{21}F_{3}N_{4}O_{2}S
- Molar mass: 402.44 g·mol^{−1}
- 3D model (JSmol): Interactive image
- SMILES: O=C(CCSc1nc(cc(n1)N(C)CCC)C(F)(F)F)NCc2ccco2
- InChI: InChI=1S/C17H21F3N4O2S/c1-3-7-24(2)14-10-13(17(18,19)20)22-16(23-14)27-9-6-15(25)21-11-12-5-4-8-26-12/h4-5,8,10H,3,6-7,9,11H2,1-2H3,(H,21,25); Key:LZHSWRWIMQRTOP-UHFFFAOYSA-N

SET2 is a drug which acts as a selective antagonist for the TRPV2 receptor. It is moderately potent with an IC_{50} of 460nM, but is highly selective for TRPV2 over the other subtypes of TRPV, and is the first such compound to be developed. A role has been suggested for TRPV2 in tumor metastasis, making this a target of interest in the treatment of cancer.

== See also ==
- HC-067047
- ZINC17988990
