= TRPV2 =

Protein-coding gene in the species Homo sapiens

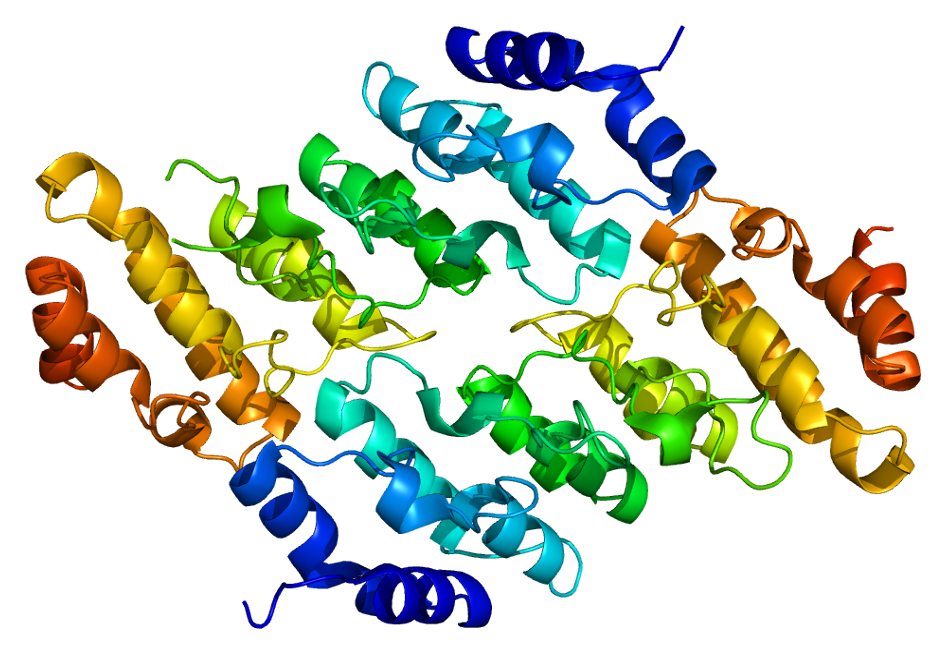

Identifiers
- Aliases: TRPV2, VRL, VRL-1, VRL1, transient receptor potential cation channel subfamily V member 2
- External IDs: OMIM: 606676; MGI: 1341836; GeneCards: TRPV2
Available structures
PDB	Ortholog search: PDBe RCSB
PDB	List of PDB id codes 2F37

Gene location (Human)
Chr.	Chromosome 17 (human)
Band	17p11.2	Start	16,415,571 bp
Band	17p11.2	End	16,437,003 bp

Gene location (Mouse)
Chr.	Chromosome 11 (mouse)
Band	11|11 B2	Start	62,465,312 bp
Band	11|11 B2	End	62,491,341 bp
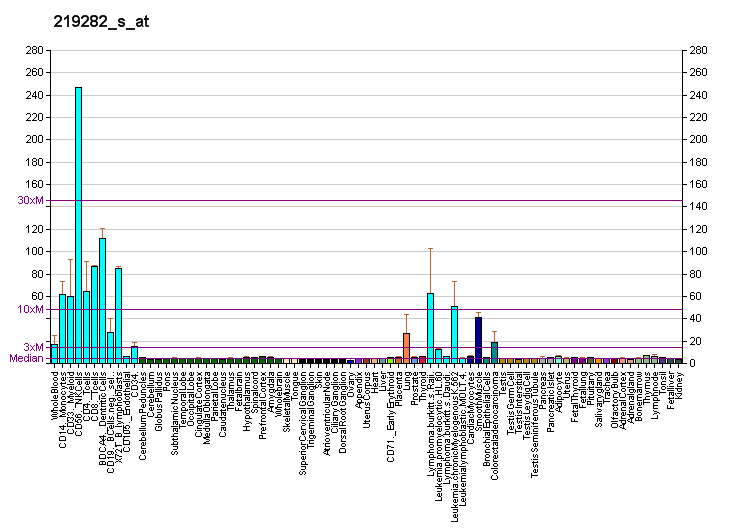
RNA expression pattern
Bgee	Human / Mouse (ortholog); Top expressed in: granulocyte; upper lobe of left lung; spleen; blood; right coronary artery; right lung; monocyte; right adrenal gland; right adrenal cortex; left coronary artery / Top expressed in: lumbar spinal ganglion; granulocyte; facial motor nucleus; thymus; stroma of bone marrow; mesenteric lymph nodes; blood; spleen; calvaria; supraoptic nucleus; More reference expression data
BioGPS	More reference expression data
Gene ontology
Molecular function	ion transmembrane transporter activity; ion channel activity; cation channel activity; calcium channel activity
Cellular component	cytoplasm; integral component of membrane; cell body; membrane; melanosome; plasma membrane; growth cone membrane; axonal growth cone; integral component of plasma membrane; intracellular anatomical structure; cell surface; axon
Biological process	sensory perception; response to heat; ion transport; positive regulation of calcium ion import; calcium ion transmembrane transport; positive regulation of axon extension; response to temperature stimulus; calcium ion transport; transmembrane transport; positive regulation of cold-induced thermogenesis
Sources:Amigo / QuickGO
Orthologs
Databases	NCBI: entry; OMA: entry
Species	Human	Mouse
Entrez	51393	22368
Ensembl	ENSG00000187688	ENSMUSG00000018507
UniProt	Q9Y5S1	Q9WTR1
RefSeq (mRNA)	NM_016113	NM_011706; NM_001382489; NM_001382490; NM_001382491; NM_001382492
RefSeq (protein)	NP_057197	NP_035836; NP_001369418; NP_001369419; NP_001369420; NP_001369421
Location (UCSC)	Chr 17: 16.42 – 16.44 Mb	Chr 11: 62.47 – 62.49 Mb
PubMed search
- Wikidata
View/Edit Human	View/Edit Mouse

Transient receptor potential cation channel subfamily V member 2 is a protein that in humans is encoded by the TRPV2 gene. TRPV2 is a nonspecific cation channel that is a part of the TRP channel family. This channel allows the cell to communicate with its extracellular environment through the transfer of ions, and responds to noxious temperatures greater than 52 °C. It has a structure similar to that of potassium channels, and has similar functions throughout multiple species; recent research has also shown multiple interactions in the human body.

== TRP subfamily ==
The vanilloid TRP subfamily (TRPV) named after the vanilloid receptor 1 consist of six members, four of them (TRPV1-TRPV4) have been related to thermal sensation. TRPV2 shares 50% of its homology with TRPV1. Compared to TRPV1 channels, TRPV2 channels do not open in response to vanilloids like capsaicin or thermal stimuli around 43 °C. This may be due to the composition of the ankyrin repeat domains in TRPV2, which are different than those in TRPV1. However, TRPV2 channels can open by noxious temperatures greater than 52 °C. TRPV2 initially was characterized as a noxious heat sensor channel, but more evidence suggest its importance in various osmosensory and mechanosensory mechanisms. The channel can open in response to a variety of stimuli including hormones, growth factors, mechanical stretching, heat, osmotic swelling, lysophospholipids, and cannabinoids. These channels are expressed in medium to large diameter neurons, motor neurons, and other non-neuronal tissues like the heart and lungs, which indicates its versatile function. The channel has an important role for basic cell function including contraction, cell proliferation, and cell death. The same channel can have different functions depending on the type of tissue. Other roles of TRPV2 continue to be explored in an attempt to define the role of translocation of TRPV2 by growth factors. SET2 is a TRPV2 selective antagonist.

== Discovery ==
TRPV2 was independently discovered by two research groups and described in 1999. It was identified in the lab of David Julius as a close homolog of TRPV1, known as the first identified thermosensitive ion channel. Itaru Kojima from Gunma University was looking for a protein which is responsible for the entry of calcium into cells in response to insulin-like growth factor-1 (IGF-1). Upon stimulation of cells with IGF-1, it was discovered that TRPV2 translocates towards and integrates into the cell membrane and increases intracellular calcium concentrations.

== Structure ==
TRPV2 channel has a similar structure to potassium channels, which are the largest ion channel family. This channel is composed of six transmembrane spanning regions (S1-S6) with a pore forming loop between S5 and S6. The pore forming loop also defines the selectivity filter, which determines the ions that are able to enter the channel. The S1-S4 region, as well as the N and C terminals of the protein, is important in reference to the gating of the channel. Although TRPV2 is a nonspecific cation channel, it is more permeable to calcium ions; calcium is an intracellular messenger and plays a very important role in a variety of different cellular processes. At rest, the pore channel is closed; in the activated state, the channel opens, allowing the influx of sodium and calcium ions that initiates an action potential.

== Species homology ==
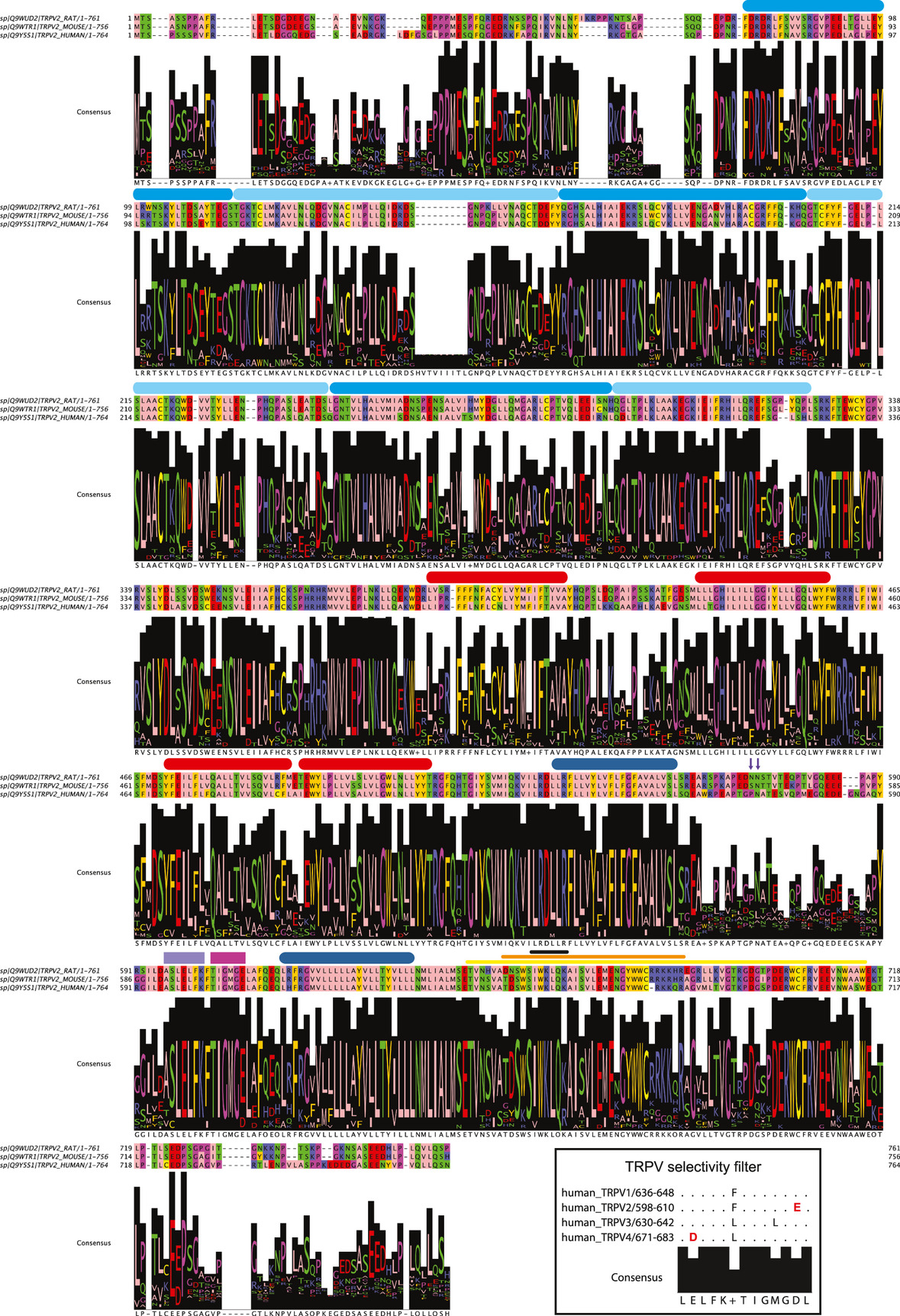
Orthologoues between rat and mouse aligned with humans

The TRPV subfamily of channels of 1 through 4 have unique functions. One important variation is that these channels trigger cellular signaling pathways via non-selective cation flux, making them unique. Specifically, the TRPV2 channel has structural similarities amongst the other members of the TRPV family. For instance, the channel consists of six transmembrane domains and a pore forming loop between S5 and S6. Within the human genome, putative homologs can be found. This suggests that the amino acids and proteins coded come from a common ancestor where their structures are conserved in function.

Among the subfamily, TRPV2 and TRPV1 share 50% of their sequence identity not only in humans, but in rats as well. The rat TRPV2 can be comparable to that of humans because they exhibit similar surface localization among one another. Each channel possesses ATP binding regions and the 50% sequence identity between TRPV1 and TRPV2 suggests that both channel's Ankyrin repeat domain (ARD) bind to different regulatory ligands as well. The channels structure can be observed as similar to that of potassium channels. In knockout mice, the physiological thermal responses show similar activation to wild-type mice. On top of that, humans, rats, and mice are considered orthologues.

== Tissue distribution ==
=== Homo sapiens ===
In homo sapiens, there is broad expression of TRPV2 in the lymph nodes, spleen, lung, appendix, and placenta; it is mostly expressed in the lungs. TRPV2 is majorly in a sub population of medium to large sensory neurons, as well as being distributed in the brain and spinal cord. The mRNA expression of TRPV2 is also found in human pulmonary and umbilical vein endothelial cells. Based on mRNA expression of TRPV2 in mice, it is also speculated that it is expressed in arterial muscle cells, which can then be influenced by blood pressure; though it was evident that TRPV2 expression was localized in the intracellular area, some growth factors localized it to the plasma cell membrane. In circulatory organs, studies and data suggest that TRPV2 may be a mechanosensor, meaning that it can sense changes in external stimuli; the mechanisms involved in opening TRPV2 by membrane stretching or hypoosmotic cell swelling have not yet been determined.

=== Mus musculus ===
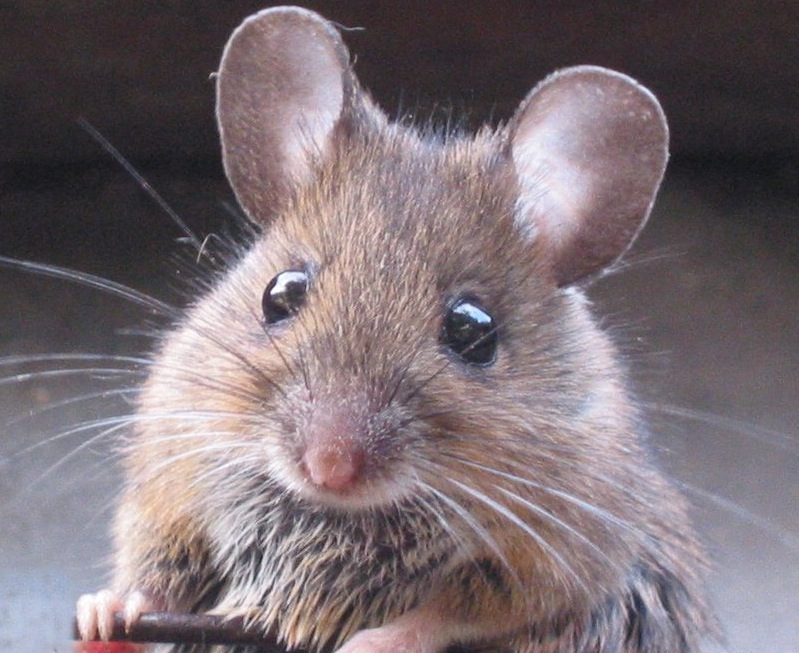
Mus Musculus-huismuis2

In mus musculus (house mouse), TRPV2 functions as a protein coding gene. There is broad expression of TRPV2 in the thymus, placenta, cerebellum, and spleen; it is most commonly expressed in the thymus. The thymus is a lymphoid organ involved in the function of the immune system, where T cells mature. T cells are an important component to the adaptive immune system, because it is where the body adapts to foreign substances; this demonstrates TRPV2's importance in the immune system. TRPV2 in mus musculus is also activated by hypo-osmolarity and cell stretching, indicating that TRPV2 plays a role in mechanotransduction in mice as well. In experiments with knockout mice (TRPV2KO mice), it was found that TRPV2 is expressed in brown adipocytes and in brown adipose tissue (BAT). It can be concluded that TRPV2 plays a role in BAT thermogenesis in mice, since it was found that a lack of TRPV2 impairs this thermogenesis in BAT; given these results, this could be a target for human obesity therapy.

=== Rattus norvegicus ===
In rattus norvegicus (Norway rat), there is broad expression of TRPV2 in the adrenal glands and the lungs, being most present in the adrenal glands. TRPV2 is also present in the thymus and spleen, but not in high amounts. Without using any external growth factors, TRPV2 is highly specific to the plasma cell membrane in rat adult dorsal root ganglions, cerebral cortex, and arterial muscle cells.

== Clinical significance ==
=== Cancer ===
TRPV2 plays a role in negative homeostatic control of excess cell proliferation by inducing apoptosis (programmed cell death). This is accomplished predominantly through the Fas pathway, also known as the death-inducing signaling complex. Activation of TRPV2 by growth factors and hormones induces the receptor to translocate from intracellular compartments to the plasma membrane, which initiates the development of death signals. An example of the role of TRPV2 in apoptosis is its expression in the bladder cancer t24 cell line. TRPV2 in bladder cancer leads to apoptosis through the influx of calcium ions through the TPRV2 channel. In some tumors, the over-expression of TRPV2 can lead to abnormal signaling pathways that drives unchecked cell proliferation and resistance to apoptotic stimuli. The over-expression of TRPV2 has been linked to several cancer types and cell lines. TRPV2 is expressed in human HepG2 cells, a cell line containing human liver carcinogenic cells. Heat allows for calcium entry into these cells through TRPV2 channels, which aid in the maintenance of these cells. TRPV2 also negatively affects patients with gliomas. TRPV2 in carcinogenic glial cells leads to resistance to apoptotic cell death, leading to harmful, carcinogenic cell survival.

=== Immunity ===
Antigens presentation

TRPV2 is expressed in the spleen, lymphocytes, and myeloid cells including granulocytes, macrophages and mast cells. Among these cell types, TRPV2 mediates cytokine release, phagocytosis, endocytosis, podosome assembly, and inflammation. The influx of calcium seems to play an important role in these functions. Mast cells are leukocytes (white blood cells) rich in histamine which are able to respond to a variety of stimuli, often initiating inflammatory and/or allergic responses. The responses generated by mast cells rely on the calcium influx in the plasma membrane with the help of channels. Surface localization of the TRPV2 protein along with coupling of the protein to calcium and proinflammatory degranulation have been found in mast cells. The activation of TRPV2 in high temperatures permits calcium ion influx, inducing the release of proinflammatory factors. Therefore, TRPV2 is essential in mast cell degranulation as a result of its response to heat. Immune cells are also able to kill pathogens by binding to them and engulfing them in a process known as phagocytosis. In macrophages TRPV2 recruitment toward the phagosome is regulated by PI3k signaling, protein kinase C, akt kinase, and Src kinases. They are able to locate these microbes through chemotaxis which is TRPV2 mediated. When the pathogen is endocytosed it is degraded then presented on the membrane of antigen presenting cells (i.e. macrophages). Macrophages present these antigens to T cells via a major histocompatibility complex (MHC). The region between the MHC-peptide and the T cell receptor is known as the immunosynapse. TRPV2 channels are highly concentrated in this region. When these two cells interact, it allows calcium to diffuse through the TRPV2 channel. TRPV2 mRNA has been detected in CD4+ and CD8+ T cells as well as in human B lymphocytes. TRPV2 is one type of ion channel that directs T cell activation, proliferation, and defense mechanisms. If the TRPV2 channel were absent or not functioning properly in T cells, T cell receptor signaling would not be optimal. TRPV2 also acts as a transmembrane protein on the surface of B cells, negatively controlling B cell activation. Abnormal TRPV2 expression has been reported in hematological diseases including multiple myeloma, myelodysplastic syndrome, Burkitt lymphoma, and acute myeloid leukemia.

=== Metabolic ===
TRPV2 seems to be essential in glucose homeostasis. It is highly expressed in MIN6 cells, which is a β-cell. These cell types are known for releasing insulin, a molecule that functions to keep glucose levels low. Under unstimulated conditions, TRPV2 is localized in the cytoplasm. Activation causes the channel to translocate to the plasma membrane. This triggers the influx of calcium resulting in insulin secretion.

=== Cardiovascular ===
TRPV2 is very important in the structure and function of cardiomyocytes (heart cells). Compared to skeletal muscles, TRPV2 is expressed 10 times as high in cardiomyocytes and is important in current conduction. TRPV2 has been shown to be involved in stretch-dependent responses in heart cells. TRPV2 expression is concentrated in intercalated discs which allows the synchronous contraction of cardiomyocytes. Abnormal expression of TRPV2 results in reduced shortening length, shortening rate, and lengthening rate which ultimately compromise cardiac contractile function.

== Ligands ==
=== Agonist ===
Agonists include:

- Anandamide
- 2-Arachidonoylglycerol
- Cannabidiol (CBD)
- Cannabidiorcol (O-1821)
- Cannabidivarin (CBDV)
- Cannabinol (CBN)
- Cannabigerol (CBG)
- Cannabigerovarin (CBGV)
- Tetrahydrocannabinol (THC)
- Tetrahydrocannabinolic acid (THCA)
- Tetrahydrocannabivarin (THCV)
- Nabilone

== See also ==
- Endocannabinoid system
- Transient receptor potential channel
- TRPV family
- Cannabinoids
