= Klüver–Bucy syndrome =

Syndrome resulting from lesions of the medial temporal lobe

Klüver-Bucy syndrome
- Specialty: Psychiatry, neurology, urology

Klüver–Bucy syndrome is a syndrome resulting from lesions of the medial temporal lobe, particularly Brodmann area 38, causing compulsive eating, hypersexuality, a compulsive need to insert inappropriate objects in the mouth (hyperorality), visual agnosia, and docility. Klüver–Bucy syndrome is more commonly found in rhesus monkeys, where the condition was first documented, than in humans. The underlying pathology of the syndrome is still controversial, with the Muller theory and a theory by Norman Geschwind offering different explanations for the condition. Treatment for Klüver–Bucy syndrome is usually with mood stabilizers, anti-psychotics, and anti-depressants.

== Symptoms ==
The list of symptoms generally include the following:

- Docility, characterized by exhibiting diminished fear responses, or reacting with unusually low aggression. This has also been termed "placidity" or "tameness".
- Dietary changes and hyperphagia, characterized by eating inappropriate objects (pica), or overeating, or both.
- Hyperorality, described by Ozawa et al. as "an oral tendency, or compulsion to examine objects by mouth".
- Hypersexuality, characterized by a heightened libido or a tendency to seek sexual stimulation from unusual or inappropriate objects.
- Visual agnosia, characterized by an inability to recognize familiar objects or people.

While this cluster of five symptoms considered to be required by these three sources, further symptoms are included or omitted in the diagnostic criteria depending on the authority. These include:

- Hypermetamorphosis, characterized by Ozawa et al. as "an irresistible impulse to notice and react to everything within sight". This is included under the classification systems described by The Neuropsychiatry of Limbic and Subcortical Disorders and "Single-Photon Emission CT and MR Findings in Klüver-Bucy".
- Lack of emotional response, diminished emotional affect. This is a symptom under The Neuropsychiatry of Limbic and Subcortical Disorders and is included under "Single-Photon Emission CT and MR Findings in Klüver-Bucy" along with apathy under docility.
- Amnesia, characterised by an inability to recall memories. This only occurs when the damage extends bilaterally into the hippocampus.

== Pathology ==
There are a few theories that attempt to explain the processes behind Klüver–Bucy syndrome and its symptoms. This topic still remains controversial, in part because complete Klüver–Bucy syndrome is rare in humans, particularly compared to monkeys. Klüver–Bucy syndrome is thought to occur from damage to temporal sections of the limbic networks, which connect to other structures that regulate emotional behavior.

Norman Geschwind's theory states that Klüver–Bucy syndrome is caused by disconnect syndrome (a condition of the brain where the two hemispheres develop separately, or at different rates), and that the initial contributor for this is blockage of visual input to the limbic circuit.

Another theory, called Muller theory, attributes Klüver–Bucy syndrome to the disconnection of pathways used for emotional regulation and memory, such as those connecting the dorsomedial thalamus to the prefrontal cortex. The medial temporal sections of the limbic system can be associated with more primitive functions, such as reproduction, food, and defense. This can be seen in the symptoms of increased hypersexuality, hyperorality, and general aggression.

== In rhesus monkeys ==
As part of an investigation by Heinrich Klüver in the 1930s into the brain areas affected by mescaline, Klüver arranged to have the temporal lobes of a number of rhesus monkeys bilaterally removed by Paul Bucy, a neurosurgeon. Klüver did not find the expected impact in response to mescaline, but did observe a series of changes in the subject animals. The six points of difference that Klüver recorded were visual agnosia, an increased tendency to explore items by mouth, hypermetamorphosis, dampening of emotional expression, altered sexual behavior, and differences in diet. Klüver later discovered similar observations by Sanger Brown and Edward Albert Sharpey-Schafer that had been published in 1881, and drew on these to substantiate his own observations.

Monkeys in the Klüver-Bucy experiment evidently had normal vision and motor skills, but exhibited "psychic blindness" – what Rusiko Bourtchouladze described in 2004 as an inability to recognize "the emotional importance of events". They did not display fear for items that would ordinarily frighten members of their species, they displayed an appetite for improper foods such as rocks or live rats, and they sought intercourse with unusual partners, including members of other species. They became extremely interested in exploring items in their environment, and became placid when approached.

== In humans ==
Klüver–Bucy syndrome was first documented among certain humans who had experienced temporal lobectomy in 1955 by H. Terzian and G.D. Ore. It was first noted in a human with meningoencephalitis in 1975 by Marlowe et al. Klüver–Bucy syndrome can manifest after either of these (lobectomies can be medically required by such reasons as accidents or tumors), but may also appear in humans with acute herpes simplex encephalitis or following a stroke. Underlying conditions contributing to the diagnosis of Klüver–Bucy syndrome include Pick's disease, Alzheimer's disease, ischemia, anoxia, progressive subcortical gliosis, Rett syndrome, porphyria, and carbon monoxide poisoning, among others.

It is rare for humans to manifest all of the identified symptoms of the syndrome; three or more are required for diagnosis. Among humans, the most common symptoms include placidity, hyperorality, and dietary changes. They may also present with an inability to recognize objects, or an inability to recognize faces, or other memory disorders. Social neuroscience research shows that changes in the temporal lobe are commonly identified as a cause for hypersexuality, and other aberrant sexual behaviors.

=== In children ===
Klüver–Bucy syndrome has been shown to occur more in adults than in children. In children, certain conditions such as herpes simplex encephalitis have the potential to manifest the syndrome. Children exhibit many of the same symptoms as adults with Klüver–Bucy syndrome, but they display these symptoms in different ways than adults. In children, hypersexuality as a symptom of Klüver–Bucy syndrome in is characterized by "frequent touching of genitals, intermittent pelvic thrusting movements, and rubbing of genitals on the bed while lying prone". Observations of hypersexuality in children have been recorded primarily in children under the age of 4. It is thought that since these behaviors have yet to be learned by children, that they display themselves in more ambiguous ways. Depending on which underlying conditions lead to Klüver–Bucy syndrome, the pattern of symptoms observed can vary.

== Treatment ==
Treatment for Klüver–Bucy syndrome focuses on controlling symptoms, as no current intervention can cure the condition. Medications used to treat these symptoms include carbamazepines, and leuprolide, which help reduce sexual behavior associated with Klüver–Bucy syndrome. Carbamazepines have been shown to have the greatest effect when treating traumatic brain injury–derived Klüver–Bucy syndrome. Other medications commonly utilized are mood stabilizers, antidepressants, and various antipsychotic drugs.

== In popular culture ==
Klüver–Bucy syndrome was featured in the lead story of the Radiolab episode "Blame". The show looked into a man who developed Klüver–Bucy syndrome after his second neurosurgery for epilepsy. The story was revisited by Radiolab in June 2017, augmented with further discussion with neuroscientist Dr. Robert Sapolsky, who addressed the syndrome and the associated legal significance of neurological defenses.

In fiction, the Klüver–Bucy syndrome has been featured in the Black Box episode "The Fear", the "Whistleblowers" episode of Blue Bloods, the "Comfort's Overrated" episode of Royal Pains, and the Criminal Minds episode "Taboo".

== See also ==
- Frontal lobe disorder
- Lawrence Weiskrantz
- Urbach–Wiethe disease

== Main sources ==
- Rockland, Kathleen S.; Jon H. Kaas; Alan Peters (1997). Cerebral Cortex: Extrastriate Cortex in Primates. Springer. ISBN 978-0-306-45530-8.
- Ozawa, Hiroshi; Masayuki Sasaki; Kenji Sugai; Toshiaki Hashimoto; Hiroshi Matsuda; Sachio Takashima; Akira Uno; Takashi Okawa (1997). "Single-Photon Emission CT and MR Findings in Klüver-Bucy" (PDF). American Journal of Neuroradiology. 18 (3): 540–542. ISSN 0195-6108. PMC 8338417. PMID 9090419.
