= Frontal lobe disorder =

Brain disorder

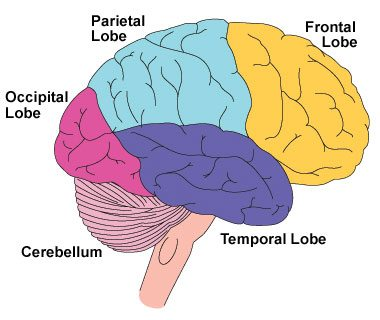
- Illustration of lateral view of the right side of the brain showing the frontal lobe, other lobes of the brain, and the cerebellum
- Specialty: Neurology, psychiatry
- Symptoms: Tremor, dystonia
- Causes: Closed head injuries
- Diagnostic method: Neuropsychological test
- Treatment: Speech therapy, supportive care

Frontal lobe disorder, also frontal lobe syndrome, is an impairment of the frontal lobe of the brain due to disease or frontal lobe injury. The frontal lobe plays a key role in executive functions such as motivation, planning, social behavior, and speech production. Frontal lobe syndrome can be caused by a range of conditions including head trauma, tumours, neurodegenerative diseases, neurodevelopmental disorders, neurosurgery and cerebrovascular disease. Frontal lobe impairment can be detected by recognition of typical signs and symptoms, use of simple screening tests, and specialist neurological testing.

== Signs and symptoms ==
The signs and symptoms of frontal lobe disorder can be indicated by dysexecutive syndrome which consists of a number of symptoms which tend to occur together. Broadly speaking, these symptoms fall into three main categories; cognitive (movement and speech), emotional, or behavioral. Although many of these symptoms regularly co-occur, it is common to encounter patients who have several, but not all of these symptoms. This is one reason why some researchers are beginning to argue that dysexecutive syndrome is not the best term to describe these various symptoms. The fact that many of the dysexecutive syndrome symptoms can occur alone has led some researchers to suggest that the symptoms should not be labelled as a "syndrome" as such. Some of the latest imaging research on frontal cortex areas suggests that executive functions may be more discrete than was previously thought. Signs and symptoms can be divided as follows:

Movement
- Tremor
- Apraxia
- Dystonia
- Gait abnormality
- Dyspraxia

Speech

- Aphasia
- Expressive aphasia

Emotional

- Difficulty in inhibiting emotions, anger, excitement
- Depression
- Difficulty in understanding others' points of view

Behavioral

- Utilization behavior
- Perseveration behavior
- Social disinhibition
- Compulsive eating

== Causes ==
The causes of frontal lobe disorders can be closed head injury. An example of this can be from an accident, which can cause damage to the orbitofrontal cortex area of the brain.Cerebrovascular disease may cause a stroke in the frontal lobe. Tumours such as meningiomas may present with a frontal lobe syndrome. Frontal lobe impairment is also a feature of Alzheimer's disease, and frontotemporal dementia.

== Pathogenesis ==
The pathogenesis of frontal lobe disorders entails various pathologies, some are as follows:

- Foster Kennedy syndrome- It is caused due to tumor of frontal lobe and gives rise to ipsilateral optic atrophy and contralateral papilledema.
- Frontal disinhibition syndrome, Fetal Alcohol Spectrum Disorder, Rett syndrome and attention deficit hyperactivity disorder
  - It is produced from frontal lobe damage due to prenatal exposure to teratogens (like ethanol), head injuries, or tumors.
  - Socially disinhibited and shows severe impairment of judgment, insight and foresight.
  - Antisocial behaviour is a characteristic feature of frontal disinhibition syndrome.
- Frontal abulic syndrome
  - Loss of initiative, creativity and curiosity
  - Pervasive emotional apathy and blandness
  - Akinetic mutism

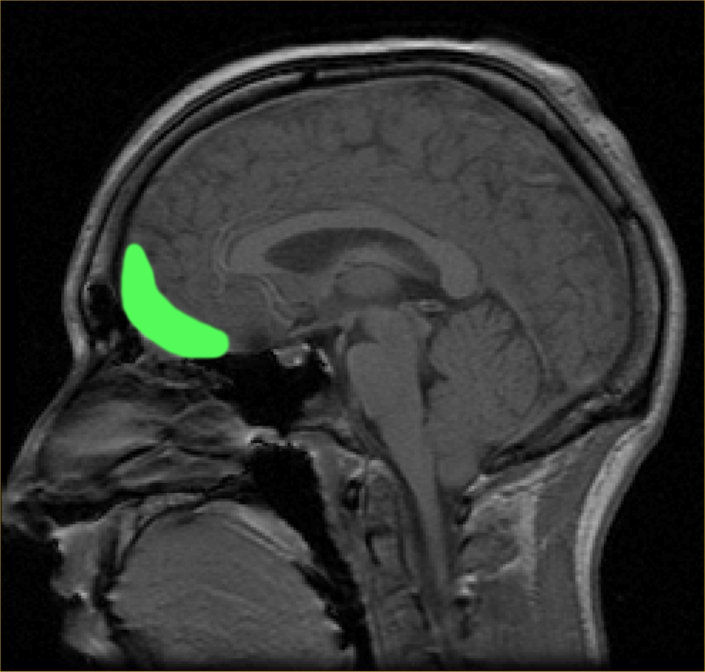
OFC-Orbitofrontal cortex

=== Anatomy and functions ===
The frontal lobe contains the precentral gyrus and prefrontal cortex and, by some conventions, the orbitofrontal cortex. These three areas are represented in both the left and the right cerebral hemispheres. The precentral gyrus or primary motor cortex is concerned with the planning, initiation and control of fine motor movements dorsolateral to each hemisphere. The dorsolateral part of the frontal lobe is concerned with planning, strategy formation, and other executive functions. The prefrontal cortex in the left hemisphere is involved with verbal memory while the prefrontal cortex in the right hemisphere is involved in spatial memory. The left frontal operculum region of the prefrontal cortex, or Broca's area, is responsible for expressive language, i.e. language production. The orbitofrontal cortex is concerned with response inhibition, impulse control, and social behaviour.

== Diagnosis ==
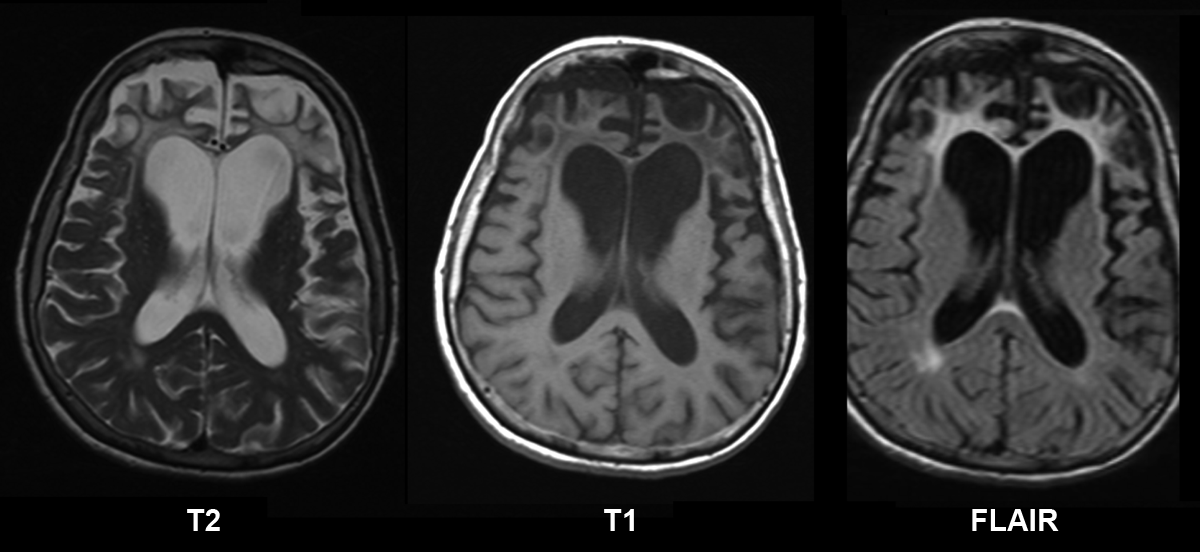
Frontotemporal dementia.

The diagnosis of frontal lobe disorder can be divided into the following three categories:

- Clinical history

Frontal lobe disorders may be recognized through a sudden and dramatic change in a person's personality, for example with loss of social awareness, disinhibition, emotional instability, irritability or impulsiveness. Alternatively, the disorder may become apparent because of mood changes such as depression, anxiety or apathy.

- Examination

On mental state examination a person with frontal lobe damage may show speech problems, with reduced verbal fluency. Typically the person is lacking in insight and judgment, but does not have marked cognitive abnormalities or memory impairment (as measured for example by the mini-mental state examination). With more severe impairment there may be echolalia or mutism. Neurological examination may show primitive reflexes (also known as frontal release signs) such as the grasp reflex. Akinesia (lack of spontaneous movement) will be present in more severe and advanced cases.

- Further investigation

A range of neuropsychological tests are available for clarifying the nature and extent of frontal lobe dysfunction. For example, concept formation and ability to shift mental sets can be measured with the Wisconsin Card Sorting Test, planning can be assessed with the Mazes subtest of the WISC. Frontotemporal dementia shows up as atrophy of the frontal cortex on MRI. Frontal impairment due to head injuries, tumours or cerebrovascular disease will also appear on brain imaging.

== Treatment ==
In terms of treatment for frontal lobe disorder, there is none, general supportive care is given, also some level of supervision could be needed. The prognosis will depend on the cause of the disorder, of course. A possible complication is that individuals with severe injuries may be disabled, such that, a caregiver may be unrecognizable to the person. Another aspect of treatment of frontal lobe disorder is speech therapy. This type of therapy might help individuals with symptoms that are associated with aphasia and dysarthria.

== History ==
Phineas Gage, who sustained a severe frontal lobe injury in 1848, has been called a case of dysexecutive syndrome. Gage's psychological changes are almost always exaggerated – of the symptoms listed, the only ones Gage can be said to have exhibited are "anger and frustration", slight memory impairment, and "difficulty in planning".

In December 2005, at his Dover Road flat in Singapore, 44-year-old caretaker Mohammad Zam Abdul Rashid attacked and battered his 38-year-old wife Ramona Johari (a production operator) to death after he accused her of getting close to a colleague. Mohammad Zam was originally charged with murder but after he was found to be suffering from frontal lobe syndrome, which went undiagnosed prior to the murder and had affected his mental responsibility at the time of the killing, Mohammad Zam was convicted of a reduced charge of manslaughter and hence sentenced to life imprisonment. The diagnosis of frontal lobe syndrome in this homicide case generated public discussions about the disorder.

== See also ==
- Attention
- Cognitive neuropsychology
- Dysexecutive syndrome
- Executive functions
- Frontal lobe
- Gourmand syndrome
- Klüver–Bucy syndrome
- Phineas Gage
- Working memory
