= Executive dysfunction =

Disruption of cognitive control processes

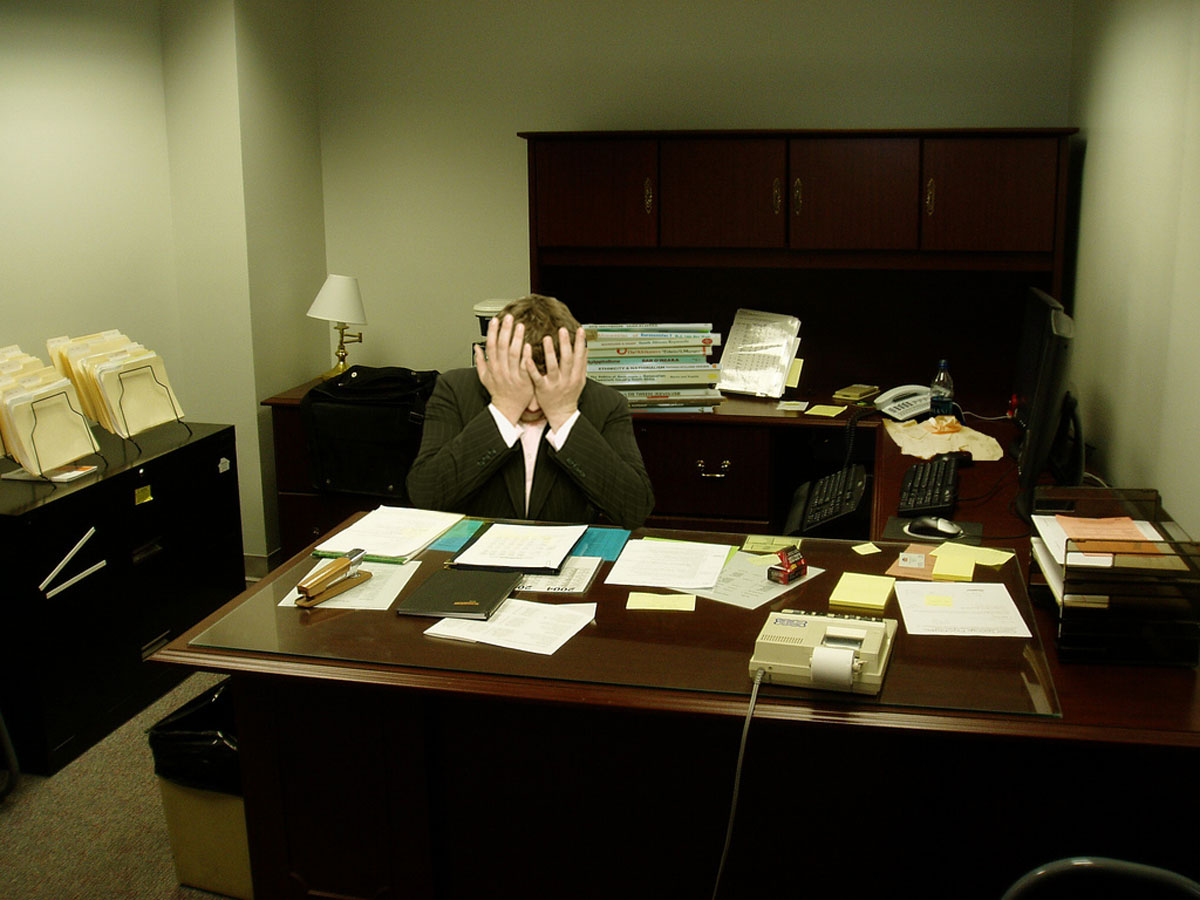
Executive dysfunction manifests as cognitive difficulties which inhibit planning, organization, initiating tasks, and regulating emotions.

In psychology and neuroscience, executive dysfunction, or executive function deficit, is a disruption to the efficacy of the executive functions, which is a group of cognitive processes that regulate, control, and manage other cognitive processes. Executive dysfunction can refer to both neurocognitive deficits and behavioural symptoms. It is implicated in numerous neurological and mental disorders, as well as short-term and long-term changes in non-clinical executive control. It can encompass other cognitive difficulties like planning, organizing, initiating tasks, and regulating emotions. It is a core characteristic of attention deficit hyperactivity disorder (ADHD) and can elucidate numerous other recognized symptoms. Extreme executive dysfunction is the cardinal feature of dysexecutive syndrome.

== Overview ==
Executive functioning is a theoretical construct representing a domain of cognitive processes that regulate, control, and manage other cognitive processes. Executive functioning is not a unitary concept; it is a broad description of the set of processes involved in certain areas of cognitive and behavioural control. Executive processes are integral to higher brain function, particularly in the areas of goal formation, planning, goal-directed action, self-monitoring, attention, response inhibition, and coordination of complex cognition and motor control for effective performance. Deficits of the executive functions are observed in all populations to varying degrees, but severe executive dysfunction can have devastating effects on cognition and behaviour in both individual and social contexts on a day-to-day basis.

Executive dysfunction does occur to a minor degree in all individuals on both short-term and long-term scales. In non-clinical populations, the activation of executive processes appears to inhibit further activation of the same processes, suggesting a mechanism for normal fluctuations in executive control. Decline in executive functioning is also associated with both normal and clinical aging. The decline of memory processes as people age appears to affect executive functions, which also points to the general role of memory in executive functioning.

Executive dysfunction appears to consistently involve disruptions in task-oriented behavior, which requires executive control in the inhibition of habitual responses and goal activation. Such executive control is responsible for adjusting behaviour to reconcile environmental changes with goals for effective behaviour. Impairments in set shifting ability are a notable feature of executive dysfunction; set shifting is the cognitive ability to dynamically change focus between points of fixation based on changing goals and environmental stimuli. This offers a parsimonious explanation for the common occurrence of impulsive, hyperactive, disorganized, and aggressive behaviour in clinical patients with executive dysfunction. A 2011 study confirms there is a lack of self-control, greater impulsivity, and greater disorganization with executive dysfunction, leading to greater amounts of aggressive behavior.

Executive dysfunction, particularly in working memory capacity, may also lead to varying degrees of emotional dysregulation, which can manifest as chronic depression, anxiety, or hyperemotionality. Russell Barkley proposed a hybrid model of the role of behavioural disinhibition in the presentation of ADHD, which has served as the basis for much research of both ADHD and broader implications of the executive system.

Other common and distinctive symptoms of executive dysfunction include utilization behaviour, which is compulsive manipulation/use of nearby objects due simply to their presence and accessibility (rather than a functional reason); and imitation behaviour, a tendency to rely on imitation as a primary means of social interaction. Research also suggests that executive set shifting is a co-mediator with episodic memory of feeling-of-knowing (FOK) accuracy, such that executive dysfunction may reduce FOK accuracy.

There is some evidence suggesting that executive dysfunction may produce beneficial effects as well as maladaptive ones. Abraham et al. demonstrate that creative thinking in schizophrenia is mediated by executive dysfunction, and they establish a firm etiology for creativity in psychoticism, pinpointing a cognitive preference for broader top-down associative thinking versus goal-oriented thinking, which closely resembles aspects of ADHD. It is postulated that elements of psychosis are present in both ADHD and schizophrenia/schizotypy due to dopamine overlap.

== Cause ==
The cause of executive dysfunction is heterogeneous, as many neurocognitive processes are involved in the executive system and each may be compromised by a range of genetic and environmental factors. Learning and development of long-term memory play a role in the severity of executive dysfunction through dynamic interaction with neurological characteristics. Studies in cognitive neuroscience suggest that executive functions are widely distributed throughout the brain, though a few areas have been isolated as primary contributors. Executive dysfunction is studied extensively in clinical neuropsychology as well, allowing correlations to be drawn between such dysexecutive symptoms and their neurological correlates. A 2015 study confirmed that executive dysfunction has a positive correlation with neurodevelopmental disorders such as autism spectrum disorder (ASD) or attention deficit hyperactivity disorder (ADHD).

Executive processes are closely integrated with memory retrieval capabilities for overall cognitive control; in particular, goal/task-information is stored in both short-term and long-term memory, and effective performance requires effective storage and retrieval of this information.

Executive dysfunction characterizes many of the symptoms observed in numerous clinical populations. In the case of acquired brain injury and neurodegenerative diseases there is a clear neurological etiology producing dysexecutive symptoms. Conversely, syndromes and disorders are defined and diagnosed based on their symptomatology rather than etiology. Thus, while Parkinson's disease, a neurodegenerative condition, causes executive dysfunction, a disorder such as ADHD is a classification given to a set of subjectively-determined symptoms implicating executive dysfunction – models from the 1990s and 2000s indicate that such clinical symptoms are caused by executive dysfunction.

=== Neurophysiology ===
Executive functioning is not a unitary concept. Many studies have been conducted in an attempt to pinpoint the exact regions of the brain that lead to executive dysfunction, producing a vast amount of often conflicting information indicating wide and inconsistent distribution of such functions. A common assumption is that disrupted executive control processes are associated with pathology in prefrontal brain regions. This is supported to some extent by the primary literature, which shows both pre-frontal activation and communication between the pre-frontal cortex and other areas associated with executive functions such as the basal ganglia and cerebellum.

In most cases of executive dysfunction, deficits are attributed to either frontal lobe damage or dysfunction, or to disruption in fronto-subcortical connectivity. Neuroimaging with PET and fMRI has confirmed the relationship between executive function and functional frontal pathology. Neuroimaging studies have also suggested that some constituent functions are not discretely localized in prefrontal regions. Functional imaging studies using different tests of executive function have implicated the dorsolateral prefrontal cortex to be the primary site of cortical activation during these tasks. In addition, PET studies of patients with Parkinson's disease have suggested that tests of executive function are associated with abnormal function in the globus pallidus and appear to be the genuine result of basal ganglia damage.

With substantial cognitive load, fMRI signals indicate a common network of frontal, parietal and occipital cortices, thalamus, and the cerebellum. This observation suggests that executive function is mediated by dynamic and flexible networks that are characterized using functional integration and effective connectivity analyses. The complete circuit underlying executive function includes both a direct and an indirect circuit. The neural circuit responsible for executive functioning is, in fact, located primarily in the frontal lobe. This main circuit originates in the dorsolateral prefrontal cortex/orbitofrontal cortex and then projects through the striatum and thalamus to return to the prefrontal cortex.

Not surprisingly, plaques and tangles in the frontal cortex can cause disruption in functions as well as damage to the connections between prefrontal cortex and the hippocampus. Another important point is in the finding that structural MRI images link the severity of white matter lesions to deficits in cognition.

The emerging view suggests that cognitive processes materialize from networks that span multiple cortical sites with closely collaborative and over-lapping functions. A challenge for future research will be to map the multiple brain regions that might combine with each other in a vast number of ways, depending on the task requirements.

=== Genetics ===
Certain genes have been identified with a clear correlation to executive dysfunction and related psychopathologies. According to Friedman et al. (2008), the heritability of executive functions is among the highest of any psychological trait. The dopamine receptor D4 gene (DRD4) with 7'-repeating polymorphism (7R) has been repeatedly shown to correlate strongly with impulsive response style on psychological tests of executive dysfunction, particularly in clinical ADHD. The catechol-o-methyl transferase gene (COMT) codes for an enzyme that degrades catecholamine neurotransmitters (DA and NE), and its Val158Met polymorphism is linked with the modulation of task-oriented cognition and behavior (including set shifting) and the experience of reward, which are major aspects of executive functioning. COMT is also linked to methylphenidate (stimulant medication) response in children with ADHD. Both the DRD4/7R and COMT/Val158Met polymorphisms are also correlated with executive dysfunction in schizophrenia and schizotypal behaviour.

=== Evolutionary perspective ===
The prefrontal lobe controls two related executive functioning domains. The first is mediation of abilities involved in planning, problem solving, and understanding information, as well as engaging in working memory processes and controlled attention. In this sense, the prefrontal lobe is involved with dealing with basic, everyday situations, especially those involving metacognitive functions. The second domain involves the ability to fulfill biological needs through the coordination of cognition and emotions which are both associated with the frontal and prefrontal areas.

From an evolutionary perspective, it has been hypothesized that the executive system may have evolved to serve several adaptive purposes. The prefrontal lobe in humans has been associated both with metacognitive executive functions and emotional executive functions. Theory and evidence suggest that the frontal lobes in other primates also mediate and regulate emotion, but do not demonstrate the metacognitive abilities that are demonstrated in humans. This uniqueness of the executive system to humans implies that there was also something unique about the environment of ancestral humans, which gave rise to the need for executive functions as adaptations to that environment. Some examples of possible adaptive problems that would have been solved by the evolution of an executive system are: social exchange, imitation and observational learning, enhanced pedagogical understanding, tool construction and use, and effective communication.

In a similar vein, some have argued that the unique metacognitive capabilities demonstrated by humans have arisen out of the development of a sophisticated language (symbolization) systems and culture. Moreover, in a developmental context, it has been proposed that each executive function capability originated as a form of public behaviour directed at the external environment, but then became self-directed, and then finally, became private to the individual, over the course of the development of self-regulation. These shifts in function illustrate the evolutionarily salient strategy of maximizing longer-term social consequences over near-term ones, through the development of an internal control of behaviour.

== Testing and measurement ==
There are several measures that can be employed to assess the executive functioning capabilities of an individual. Although a trained non-professional working outside of an institutionalized setting can legally and competently perform many of these measures, a trained professional administering the test in a standardized setting will yield the most accurate results.

=== Clock drawing test ===
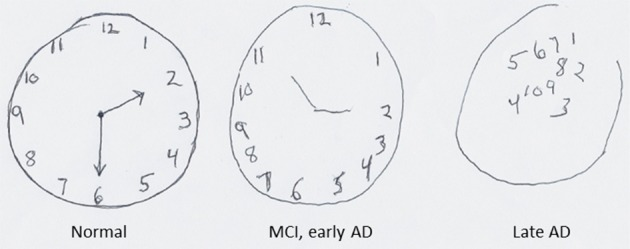

The clock drawing test (CDT) is a brief cognitive task that can be used by physicians who suspect neurological dysfunction based on history and physical examination. It is relatively easy to train non-professional staff to administer a CDT. Therefore, this is a test that can easily be administered in educational and geriatric settings and can be utilized as a precursory measure to indicate the likelihood of further/future deficits. Also, generational, educational and cultural differences are not perceived as impacting the utility of the CDT.

The procedure of the CDT begins with the instruction to the participant to draw a clock reading a specific time (generally 11:10). After the task is complete, the test administrator draws a clock with the hands set at the same specific time. Then the patient is asked to copy the image. Errors in clock drawing are classified according to the following categories: omissions, perseverations, rotations, misplacements, distortions, substitutions and additions. Memory, concentration, initiation, energy, mental clarity and indecision are all measures that are scored during this activity. Those with deficits in executive functioning will often make errors on the first clock but not the second. In other words, they will be unable to generate their own example, but will show proficiency in the copying task.

=== Stroop task ===
The cognitive mechanism involved in the Stroop task is referred to as directed attention. The Stroop task requires the participant to engage in and allows assessment of processes such as attention management, speed and accuracy of reading words and colours and of inhibition of competing stimuli. The stimulus is a colour word that is printed in a different colour than what the written word reads. For example, the word "red" is written in a blue font. One must verbally classify the colour that the word is displayed/printed in, while ignoring the information provided by the written word. In the aforementioned example, this would require the participant to say "blue" when presented with the stimulus. Although the majority of people will show some slowing when given incompatible text versus font colour, this is more severe in individuals with deficits in inhibition. The Stroop task takes advantage of the fact that most humans are so proficient at reading colour words that it is extremely difficult to ignore this information, and instead acknowledge, recognize and say the colour the word is printed in. The Stroop task is an assessment of attentional vitality and flexibility. More modern variations of the Stroop task tend to be more difficult and often try to limit the sensitivity of the test.

=== Trail-making test ===
Another prominent test of executive dysfunction is known as the Trail-making test. This test is composed of two main parts (Part A & Part B). Part B differs from Part A specifically in that it assesses more complex factors of motor control and perception. Part B of the Trail-making test consists of multiple circles containing letters (A-L) and numbers (1-12). The participant's objective for this test is to connect the circles in order, alternating between number and letter (e.g. 1-A-2-B) from start to finish. The participant is required not to lift their pencil from the page. The task is also timed as a means of assessing speed of processing. Set-switching tasks in Part B have low motor and perceptual selection demands, and therefore provide a clearer index of executive function. Throughout this task, some of the executive function skills that are being measured include impulsivity, visual attention and motor speed.

=== Wisconsin card sorting test ===
The Wisconsin Card Sorting Test (WCST) is used to determine an individual's competence in abstract reasoning, and the ability to change problem-solving strategies when needed. These abilities are primarily determined by the frontal lobes and basal ganglia, which are crucial components of executive functioning; making the WCST a good measure for this purpose.

The WCST utilizes a deck of 128 cards that contains four stimulus cards. The figures on the cards differ with respect to color, quantity, and shape. The participants are then given a pile of additional cards and are asked to match each one to one of the previous cards. Typically, children between ages 9 and 11 are able to show the cognitive flexibility that is needed for this test.

== In clinical populations ==
The executive system's broad range of functions relies on, and is instrumental in, a broad range of neurocognitive processes. Clinical presentation of severe executive dysfunction that is unrelated to a specific disease or disorder is classified as a dysexecutive syndrome, and often appears following damage to the frontal lobes of the cerebral cortex. As a result, executive dysfunction is implicated etiologically or co-morbidly in many psychiatric illnesses, which often show the same symptoms as dysexecutive syndrome. It has been assessed and researched extensively in relation to cognitive developmental disorders, psychotic disorders, mood disorders, and conduct disorder, as well as neurodegenerative diseases and acquired brain injury (ABI).

Environmental dependency syndrome is a dysexecutive syndrome marked by significant behavioural dependence on environmental cues and is marked by excessive imitation and utilization behaviour. It has been observed in patients with a variety of etiologies including ABI, exposure to phendimetrazine tartrate, stroke, and various frontal lobe lesions.

=== Attention deficit hyperactivity disorder ===
A triad of core symptoms – inattention, hyperactivity, and impulsivity – characterize attention deficit hyperactivity disorder (ADHD). Individuals with ADHD often experience problems with organization, discipline, and setting priorities, and these difficulties often persist from childhood through adulthood. In both children and adults with ADHD, an underlying executive dysfunction involving the prefrontal regions and other interconnected subcortical structures has been found. As a result, people with ADHD commonly perform more poorly than matched controls on interference control, mental flexibility and verbal fluency. Also, a more central impairment in self-regulation is noted in cases of ADHD. However, some research has suggested the possibility that the severity of executive dysfunction in individuals with ADHD declines with age as they learn to compensate for the aforementioned deficits. Thus, a decrease in executive dysfunction in adults with ADHD as compared to children with ADHD is thought reflective of compensatory strategies employed on behalf of the adults (e.g. using schedules to organize tasks) rather than neurological differences.

Although ADHD has typically been conceptualized in a categorical diagnostic paradigm, it has also been proposed that this disorder should be considered within a more dimensional behavioural model that links executive functions to observed deficits. Proponents argue that classic conceptions of ADHD falsely localize the problem at perception (input) rather than focusing on the inner processes involved in producing appropriate behaviour (output). Moreover, others have theorized that the appropriate development of inhibition (something that is seen to be lacking in individuals with ADHD) is essential for the normal performance of other neuropsychological abilities such as working memory, and emotional self-regulation. Thus, within this model, deficits in inhibition are conceptualized to be developmental and the result of atypically operating executive systems.

==== Obesity ====
Both ADHD and obesity are complicated disorders and each produces a large impact on an individual's social well-being. This being both a physical and psychological disorder has reinforced that obese individuals with ADHD need more treatment time (with associated costs), and are at a higher risk of developing physical and emotional complications. The cognitive ability to develop a comprehensive self-construct and the ability to demonstrate capable emotion regulation is a core deficit observed in people with ADHD and is linked to deficits in executive function. Overall, low executive functioning seen in individuals with ADHD has been correlated with tendencies to overeat, as well as with emotional eating. This particular interest in the relationship between ADHD and obesity is rarely clinically assessed and may deserve more attention in future research.

=== Schizophrenia ===
Schizophrenia is commonly described as a mental disorder in which a person becomes detached from reality because of disruptions in the pattern of thinking and perception. Although the etiology is not completely understood, it is closely related to dopaminergic activity and is strongly associated with both neurocognitive and genetic elements of executive dysfunction. Individuals with schizophrenia may demonstrate amnesia for portions of their episodic memory. Observed damage to explicit, consciously accessed memory is generally attributed to the fragmented thoughts that characterize the disorder. These fragmented thoughts are suggested to produce a similarly fragmented organization in memory during encoding and storage, making retrieval more difficult. However, implicit memory is generally preserved in patients with schizophrenia.

Patients with schizophrenia demonstrate spared performance on measures of visual and verbal attention and concentration, as well as on immediate digit span recall, suggesting that observed deficits cannot be attributed to deficits in attention or short-term memory. However, impaired performance was measured on psychometric measures assumed to assess higher order executive function. Working memory and multi-tasking impairments typically characterize the disorder. Persons with schizophrenia also tend to demonstrate deficits in response inhibition and cognitive flexibility.

Patients often demonstrate noticeable deficits in the central executive component of working memory as conceptualized by Baddeley and Hitch. However, performance on tasks associated with the phonological loop and visuospatial sketchpad are typically less affected. More specifically, patients with schizophrenia show impairment to the central executive component of working memory, specific to tasks in which the visuospatial system is required for central executive control. The phonological system appears to be more generally spared overall.

=== Autism spectrum disorder ===
Autism is diagnosed based on the presence of markedly abnormal or impaired development in social interaction and communication and a markedly restricted or repetitive repertoire of stereotypic movements, activities, and/or interests. It is a disorder that is defined according to behaviour as no specific biological markers are known. Due to the variability in severity and impairment in functioning exhibited by autistic people, the disorder is typically conceptualized as existing along a continuum (or spectrum) of severity.

Autistic individuals commonly show impairment in three main areas of executive functioning:

- Fluency. Fluency refers to the ability to generate novel ideas and responses. Although adult populations are largely underrepresented in this area of research, findings have suggested that autistic children generate fewer novel words and ideas and produce less complex responses than matched controls.
- Planning. Planning refers to a complex, dynamic process, wherein a sequence of planned actions must be developed, monitored, re-evaluated and updated. Autistic persons demonstrate impairment on tasks requiring planning abilities relative to typically functioning controls, with this impairment maintained over time. As might be suspected, in the case of autism comorbid with learning disability, an additive deficit is observed in many cases.
- Flexibility. Poor mental flexibility, as demonstrated in autistic individuals, is characterized by perseverative, stereotyped behaviour, and deficits in both the regulation and modulation of motor acts. Some research has suggested that autistic individuals experience a sort of 'stuck-in-set' perseveration that is specific to the disorder, rather than a more global perseveration tendency. These deficits have been exhibited in cross-cultural samples and have been shown to persist over time. Autistic individuals have also been shown to react slower as well as perform slower in tasks that require mental flexibility when compared to their non-autistic peers.

Although there has been some debate, inhibition is generally no longer considered to be an executive function deficit in autistic people. Autistic individuals have demonstrated differential performance on various tests of inhibition, with results being taken to indicate a general difficulty in the inhibition of a habitual response. However, performance on the Stroop task, for example, has been unimpaired relative to matched controls. An alternative explanation has suggested that executive function tests that demonstrate a clear rationale are passed by autistic individuals. In this light, it is the design of the measures of inhibition that have been implicated in the observation of impaired performance rather than inhibition being a core deficit.

In general, autistic individuals show relatively spared performance on tasks that do not require mentalization. These include: use of desire and emotion words, sequencing behavioural pictures, and the recognition of basic facial emotional expressions. In contrast, autistic individuals typically demonstrated impaired performance on tasks that do require mentalizing. These include: false beliefs, use of belief and idea words, sequencing mentalistic pictures, and recognizing complex emotions such as scheming.

=== Bipolar disorder ===
Bipolar disorder is a mood disorder that is characterized by both highs (mania) and lows (depression) in mood. These changes in mood sometimes alternate rapidly (changes within days or weeks) and sometimes not so rapidly (within weeks or months). A 2006 study provided strong evidence of cognitive impairments in individuals with bipolar disorder, particularly in executive function and verbal learning. Moreover, these cognitive deficits appear to be consistent cross-culturally, indicating that these impairments are characteristic of the disorder and not attributable to differences in cultural values, norms, or practice. Functional neuroimaging studies have implicated abnormalities in the dorsolateral prefrontal cortex and the anterior cingulate cortex as being volumetrically different in individuals with bipolar disorder.

Individuals affected by bipolar disorder exhibit deficits in strategic thinking, inhibitory control, working memory, attention, and initiation that are independent of affective state. In contrast to the more generalized cognitive impairment demonstrated in persons with schizophrenia, for example, deficits in bipolar disorder are typically less severe and more restricted. It has been suggested that a "stable dys-regulation of prefrontal function or the subcortical-frontal circuitry [of the brain] may underlie the cognitive disturbances of bipolar disorder". Executive dysfunction in bipolar disorder is suggested to be associated particularly with the manic state, and is largely accounted for in terms of the formal thought disorder that is a feature of mania. However, patients with bipolar disorder with a history of psychosis demonstrated greater impairment on measures of executive functioning and spatial working memory compared with bipolar patients without a history of psychosis suggesting that psychotic symptoms are correlated with executive dysfunction.

=== Parkinson's disease ===
Parkinson's disease (PD) primarily involves damage to subcortical brain structures and is usually associated with movement difficulties, in addition to problems with memory and thought processes. Persons affected by PD often demonstrate difficulties in working memory, a component of executive functioning. Cognitive deficits found in early PD process appear to involve primarily the fronto-executive functions. Moreover, studies of the role of dopamine in the cognition of PD patients have suggested that PD patients with inadequate dopamine supplementation are more impaired in their performance on measures of executive functioning. This suggests that dopamine may contribute to executive control processes. Increased distractibility, problems in set formation and maintaining and shifting attentional sets, deficits in executive functions such as self-directed planning, problems solving, and working memory have been reported in PD patients. In terms of working memory specifically, persons with PD show deficits in the areas of: a) spatial working memory; b) central executive aspects of working memory; c) loss of episodic memories; d) locating events in time.

Spatial working memory
PD patients often demonstrate difficulty in updating changes in spatial information and often become disoriented. They do not keep track of spatial contextual information in the same way that a typical person would do almost automatically. Similarly, they often have trouble remembering the locations of objects that they have recently seen, and thus also have trouble with encoding this information into long-term memory.

Central executive aspects
PD is often characterized by a difficulty in regulating and controlling one's stream of thought, and how memories are utilized in guiding future behaviour. Also, persons affected by PD often demonstrate perseverative behaviours such as continuing to pursue a goal after it is completed, or an inability to adopt a new strategy that may be more appropriate in achieving a goal. However, some research from 2007 suggests that PD patients may actually be less persistent in pursuing goals than typical persons and may abandon tasks sooner when they encounter problems of a higher level of difficulty.

Loss of episodic memories
The loss of episodic memories in PD patients typically demonstrates a temporal gradient wherein older memories are generally more preserved than newer memories. Also, while forgetting event content is less compromised in Parkinson's than in Alzheimer's, the opposite is true for event data memories.

Locating events in time
PD patients often demonstrate deficits in their ability to sequence information, or date events. Part of the problems is hypothesized to be due to a more fundamental difficulty in coordinating or planning retrieval strategies, rather than failure at the level of encoding or storing information in memory. This deficit is also likely to be due to an underlying difficulty in properly retrieving script information. PD patients often exhibit signs of irrelevant intrusions, incorrect ordering of events, and omission of minor components in their script retrieval, leading to disorganized and inappropriate application of script information.

== Treatment ==
=== Medication ===
Methylphenidate- and amphetamine-based medications are first-line treatments for ADHD. On average, these stimulants are more effective at treating core ADHD symptoms including executive dysfunction than psychosocial treatment alone. Their efficacy treating ADHD is among the highest of any psychotropic medication treating any psychiatric condition. Treatment with methylphenidate or norepinephrine reuptake inhibitor reduces core ADHD symptoms equally well with or without psychosocial treatment. However, psychosocial treatment may confer other benefits.

=== Psychosocial treatment ===
Since 1997, there has been experimental and clinical practice of psychosocial treatment for adults with executive dysfunction, and particularly attention-deficit/hyperactivity disorder (ADHD). Psychosocial treatment addresses the many facets of executive difficulties, and as the name suggests, covers academic, occupational and social deficits. Psychosocial treatment facilitates marked improvements in major symptoms of executive dysfunction such as time management, organization and self-esteem. One kind of psychosocial treatment has been found to be particularly helpful, Behavioral Parent Training (BPT). Behavioral Parent Training (BPT) helps parents learn, through the help of a trained mental health professional, how to help their child behave better. This outlines proper use of reward and punishment with the child, mostly using methods of positive and negative reinforcement rather than punishment. For example, taking away a positive reinforcement such as praise, as opposed to adding a punishment. Psychosocial treatments are effective for adults with attention-deficit/hyperactivity disorder (ADHD) as well. One study shows that there are a number of useful psychosocial interventions that help adults with ADHD live better lives too. These included mindfulness training, cognitive based behavioral therapy, as well as education to help the participants recognize problem behaviors in their lives.

=== Cognitive behavioral therapy and group rehabilitation ===
Cognitive behavioral therapy (CBT) is a frequently suggested treatment for executive dysfunction, but has shown limited effectiveness. However, a study of CBT in a group rehabilitation setting showed a significant increase in positive treatment outcome compared with individual therapy. Patients' self-reported symptoms on 16 different ADHD/executive-related items were reduced following the treatment period.

=== Treatment for patients with acquired brain injury ===
The use of auditory stimuli has been examined in the treatment of dysexecutive syndrome. The presentation of auditory stimuli causes an interruption in current activity, which appears to aid in preventing "goal neglect" by increasing the patients' ability to monitor time and focus on goals. Given such stimuli, subjects no longer performed below their age group average IQ.

Patients with acquired brain injury have also been exposed to goal management training (GMT). GMT skills are associated with paper-and-pencil tasks that are suitable for patients having difficulty setting goals. From these studies there has been support for the effectiveness of GMT and the treatment of executive dysfunction due to ABI.

== Developmental context ==
An understanding of how executive dysfunction shapes development has implications how we conceptualize executive functions and their role in shaping the individual. Disorders affecting children such as ADHD, along with oppositional defiant disorder, conduct disorder, high functioning autism, and Tourette's syndrome have all been suggested to involve executive functioning deficits. The main focus of research in 2000s had been on working memory, planning, set shifting, inhibition, and fluency. This research suggests that differences exist between typically functioning, matched controls, and clinical groups, on measures of executive functioning.

Some research has suggested a link between a child's abilities to gain information about the world around them and having the ability to override emotions in order to behave appropriately. One study required children to perform a task from a series of psychological tests, with their performance used as a measure of executive function. The tests included assessments of: executive functions (self-regulation, monitoring, attention, flexibility in thinking), language, sensorimotor, visuospatial, and learning, in addition to social perception. The findings suggested that the development of theory of mind in younger children is linked to executive control abilities with development impaired in individuals who exhibit signs of executive dysfunction.

It has been made known that young children with behavioral problems show poor verbal ability and executive functions. The exact distinction between parenting style and the importance of family structure on child development is still somewhat unclear. However, in infancy and early childhood, parenting is among the most critical external influences on child reactivity. In Mahoney's study of maternal communication, results indicated that the way mothers interacted with their children accounted for almost 25% of variability in children's rate of development. Every child is unique, making parenting an emotional challenge that should be most closely related to the child's level of emotional self-regulation (persistence, frustration and compliance). A promising approach that was being investigated in 2006 amid intellectually disabled children and their parents is responsive teaching. Responsive teaching is an early intervention curriculum designed to address the cognitive, language, and social needs of young children with developmental problems. Based on the principle of "active learning", responsive teaching is a method that was being applauded in 1980s as adaptable for individual caregivers, children and their combined needs The effect of parenting styles on the development of children is an important area of research that seems to be forever ongoing and altering.

== Comorbidity ==
Flexibility problems are more likely to be related to anxiety, and metacognition problems are more likely to be related to depression.

== Socio-cultural implications ==
=== Education ===
In the classroom environment, children with executive dysfunction typically demonstrate skill deficits that can be categorized into two broad domains: a) self-regulatory skills; and b) goal-oriented skills. The table below is an adaptation of McDougall's summary and provides an overview of specific executive function deficits that are commonly observed in a classroom environment. It also offers examples of how these deficits are likely to manifest in behaviour.

Self-regulatory skills

Often exhibit deficits in...	Manifestations in the classroom
Perception. Awareness of something happening in the environment	Doesn't "see" what is happening; doesn't "hear" instructions
Modulation. Awareness of the amount of effort needed to perform a task (successfully)	Commission of errors at easy levels and success at harder levels; indication that student thinks the task is "easy" then cannot do it correctly; performance improves once the student realized that the task is more difficult than originally thought
Sustained attention. Ability to focus on a task or situation despite distractions, fatigue or boredom	Initiates the task, but doesn't continue to work steadily; easily distracted; fatigues easily; complains task is too long or too boring
Flexibility. Ability to change focus, adapt to changing conditions or revise plans in the face of obstacles, new information or mistakes (can also be considered as "adaptability")	Slow to stop one activity and begin another after being instructed to do so; tendency to stay with one plan or strategy even after it is shown to be ineffective; rigid adherence to routines; refusal to consider new information
Working memory. Ability to hold information in memory while performing complex tasks with information	Forgets instructions (especially if multi-step); frequently asks for information to be repeated; forgets books at home or at school; can not do mental arithmetic; difficulty making connections with previously learned information; difficulty with reading comprehension
Response inhibition. Capacity to think before acting (deficits are often observed as "impulsivity")	Seems to act without thinking; frequently interrupts; talks out in class; often out of seat or away from desk; rough play gets out of control; doesn't consider consequences of actions
Emotional regulation. Ability to modulate emotional responses	Temper outbursts; cries easily; very easily frustrated; very quick to anger; acts silly

Goal-oriented skills

Often exhibit deficits in...	Manifestations in the classroom
Planning. Ability to list steps needed to reach a goal or complete a task	Doesn't know where to start when given large assignments; easily overwhelmed by task demands; difficulty developing a plan for long-term projects; problem-solving strategies are very limited and haphazard; starts working before adequately considering the demands of a task; difficulty listing steps required to complete a task
Organization. Ability to arrange information or materials according to a system	Disorganized desk, binder, notebooks, etc.; loses books, papers, assignments, etc.; doesn't write down important information; difficulty retrieving information when needed
Time management. Ability to comprehend how much time is available, or to estimate how long it will take to complete a task, and keep track of how much time has passed relative to the amount of the task completed	Very little work accomplished during a specified period of time; wasting time, then rushing to complete a task at the last minute; often late to class/assignments are often late; difficulty estimating how long it takes to do a task; limited awareness of the passage of time
Self-monitoring. Ability to stand back and evaluate how you are doing (can also be thought of as "metacognitive" abilities)	Makes "careless" errors; does not check work before handing it in; does not stop to evaluate how things are going in the middle of a task or activity; thinks a task was well done, when in fact it was done poorly; thinks a task was poorly done, when in fact it was done well

Teachers play a crucial role in the implementation of strategies aimed at improving academic success and classroom functioning in individuals with executive dysfunction. In a classroom environment, the goal of intervention should ultimately be to apply external control, as needed (e.g. adapt the environment to suit the child, provide adult support) in an attempt to modify problem behaviours or supplement skill deficits. Ultimately, executive function difficulties should not be attributed to negative personality traits or characteristics (e.g. laziness, lack of motivation, apathy, and stubbornness) as these attributions are neither useful nor accurate.

Several factors should be considered in the development of intervention strategies. These include, but are not limited to: developmental level of the child, comorbid disabilities, environmental changes, motivating factors, and coaching strategies. It is also recommended that strategies should take a proactive approach in managing behaviour or skill deficits (when possible), rather than adopt a reactive approach. For example, an awareness of where a student may have difficulty throughout the course of the day can aid the teacher in planning to avoid these situations or in planning to accommodate the needs of the student.

People with executive dysfunction have a slower cognitive processing speed and thus often take longer to complete tasks than people who demonstrate typical executive function capabilities. This can be frustrating for the individual and can serve to impede academic progress. Disorders affecting children such as ADHD, along with oppositional defiant disorder, conduct disorder, high functioning autism and Tourette's syndrome have all been suggested to involve executive functioning deficits. The main focus of research in the 2000s had been on working memory, planning, set shifting, inhibition, and fluency. This research suggests that differences exist between typically functioning, matched controls and clinical groups, on measures of executive functioning.

Moreover, some people with ADHD report experiencing frequent feelings of drowsiness. This can hinder their attention for lectures, readings, and completing assignments. Individuals with this disorder have also been found to require more stimuli for information processing in reading and writing. Slow processing may manifest in behavior as signaling a lack of motivation on behalf of the learner. However, slow processing is reflective of an impairment of the ability to coordinate and integrate multiple skills and information sources.

The main concern with individuals with autism regarding learning is in the imitation of skills. This can be a barrier in many aspects such as learning about others intentions, mental states, speech, language, and general social skills. Individuals with autism tend to be dependent on the routines that they have already mastered, and have difficulty with initiating new non-routine tasks. Although an estimated 25–40% of people with autism also have a learning disability, many will demonstrate an impressive rote memory and memory for factual knowledge. As such, repetition is the primary and most successful method for instruction when teaching people with autism.

Being attentive and focused for people with Tourette's syndrome is a difficult process. People affected by this disorder tend to be easily distracted and act very impulsively. That is why it is very important to have a quiet setting with few distractions for the ultimate learning environment. Focusing is particularly difficult for those who are affected by Tourette's syndrome comorbid with other disorders such as ADHD or obsessive-compulsive disorder, it makes focusing very difficult. Also, these individuals can be found to repeat words or phrases consistently either immediately after they are learned or after a delayed period of time.

=== Criminal behaviour ===
Prefrontal dysfunction has been found as a marker for persistent, criminal behavior. The prefrontal cortex is involved with mental functions including; effective range of emotions, forethought, and self-control. Moreover, there is a scarcity of mental control displayed by individuals with a dysfunction in this area over their behavior, reduced flexibility and self-control and their difficulty to conceive behavioral consequences, which may conclude in unstable (or criminal) behavior. In a 2008 study conducted by Barbosa & Monteiro, it was discovered that the recurrent criminals that were considered in this study had executive dysfunction. Since abnormalities in executive function can limit how people respond to rehabilitation and re-socialization programs these findings of the recurrent criminals are justified. Statistically significant relations have been discerned between anti-social behavior and executive function deficits. These findings relate to the emotional instability that is connected with executive function as a detrimental symptom that can also be linked towards criminal behavior. Conversely, it is unclear as to the specificity of anti-social behavior to executive function deficits as opposed to other generalized neuropsychological deficits. The uncontrollable deficiency of executive function has an increased expectancy for aggressive behavior that can result in a criminal deed. Orbitofrontal injury also hinders the ability to be risk avoidant, make social judgments, and may cause reflexive aggression. A common retort to these findings is that the higher incidence of cerebral lesions among the criminal population may be due to the peril associated with a life of crime. Along with this reasoning, it would be assumed that some other personality trait is responsible for the disregard of social acceptability and reduction in social aptitude.

Furthermore, some think the dysfunction cannot be entirely to blame. There are interacting environmental factors that also have an influence on the likelihood of criminal action. This theory proposes that individuals with this deficit are less able to control impulses or foresee the consequences of actions that seem attractive at the time (see above) and are also typically provoked by environmental factors. One must recognize that the frustrations of life, combined with a limited ability to control life events, can easily cause aggression and/or other criminal activities.

== See also ==
- Autonoetic consciousness – Human ability for introspection
