= Dysexecutive syndrome =

Condition usually resulting from brain damage

Dysexecutive syndrome (DES) consists of a group of symptoms, usually resulting from brain damage, that fall into cognitive, behavioural and emotional categories and tend to occur together. The term was introduced by Alan Baddeley to describe a common pattern of dysfunction in executive functions, such as planning, abstract thinking, flexibility and behavioural control. It is thought to be Baddeley's hypothesized working memory system and the central executive that are the hypothetical systems impaired in DES. The syndrome was once known as frontal lobe syndrome; however 'dysexecutive syndrome' is preferred because it emphasizes the functional pattern of deficits (the symptoms) over the location of the syndrome in the frontal lobe, which is often not the only area affected.

== Signs and symptoms ==
Symptoms of DES fall into three broad categories: cognitive, emotional and behavioural. Many of the symptoms can be seen as a direct result of impairment to the central executive component of working memory, which is responsible for attentional control and inhibition. Although many of the symptoms regularly co-occur, it is common to encounter patients who have several, but not all symptoms. The accumulated effects of the symptoms have a large impact on daily life.

=== Cognitive symptoms ===
Cognitive symptoms refer to a person's ability to process thoughts. Cognition primarily refers to memory, the ability to learn new information, speech, and reading comprehension. Deficits within this area cause many problems with everyday life decisions.

One of the main difficulties for an individual with DES is planning and reasoning. Impaired planning and reasoning affect the individual's ability to realistically assess and manage the problems of everyday living. New problems and situations may be especially poorly handled because of the inability to transfer previous knowledge to the new event. An individual that has DES may have a short attention span due to impairment in attentional control. This may alter the individual's ability to focus, and as such have difficulty with reading and following a storyline or conversation. For instance, they can easily lose track of conversations which can make it difficult to hold a meaningful conversation and may result in avoiding social interactions.

Individuals with DES will have very poor working memory and short term memory due to executive dysfunction. The dysfunction can range from mild and subtle to severe and obvious. There is a tremendous variability in the manifestations of executive dysfunction with strong influences often apparent from the affected person's personality, life experiences and intellect. Individuals with DES may experience confabulation, which is the spontaneous reporting of events that never happened. This can affect their autobiographical memory. It is thought that patients may not be able to assess the accuracy of memory retrieval and therefore elaborate on implausible memories.

Individuals with dementia, delirium or other severe psychiatric illnesses combined with DES often have disturbed sleep patterns. Some will not recognize that it is night-time and may become upset when someone tries to correct them.

=== Emotional symptoms ===
The emotional symptoms that individuals with DES experience may be quite extreme and can cause extensive problems. They may have difficulty inhibiting many types of emotions such as anger, excitement, sadness, or frustration. Due to multiple impairments of cognitive functioning, there can be much more frustration when expressing certain feelings and understanding how to interpret everyday situations. Individuals with DES may have higher levels of aggression or anger because they lack abilities that are related to behavioural control. They can also have difficulty understanding others' points of view, which can lead to anger and frustration.

=== Behavioural symptoms ===
Behavioural symptoms are evident through an individual's actions. People with DES often lose their social skills because their judgments and insights into what others may be thinking are impaired. They may have trouble knowing how to behave in group situations and may not know how to follow social norms. The central executive helps control impulses; therefore when impaired, patients have poor impulse control. This can lead to higher levels of aggression and anger. DES can also cause patients to appear self-centered and stubborn.

Utilization behaviour is when a patient automatically uses an object in the appropriate manner, but at an inappropriate time. For example, if a pen and paper are placed in front of an individual with DES they will start to write or if there is a deck of cards they will deal them out. Patients showing this symptom will begin the behaviour in the middle of conversations or during auditory tests. Utilization behaviour is thought to occur because an action is initiated when an object is seen, but patients with DES lack the central executive control to inhibit acting it out at inappropriate times.

Perseveration is also often seen in patients with DES. Perseveration is the repetition of thoughts, behaviours, or actions after they have already been completed. For instance, continually blowing out a match, after it is no longer lit is an example of perseveration behaviour. There are three types of perseveration: continuous perseveration, stuck-in-set perseveration, and recurrent perseveration. Stuck-in-set perseveration is most often seen in dysexecutive syndrome. This type of perseveration refers to when a patient cannot get out of a specific frame of mind, such as when asked to name animals they can only name one. If you ask them to then name colours, they may still give you animals. Perseveration may explain why some patients appear to have obsessive–compulsive disorder.

=== Comorbid disorders ===
DES often occurs with other disorders, which is known as comorbidity. Many studies have examined the presence of DES in patients with schizophrenia. Results of schizophrenic patients on the Behavioural Assessment of the Dysexecutive Syndrome (BADS) test (discussed below) are comparable to brain injured patients. Further, results of BADS have been shown to correlate with phases of schizophrenia. Patients in the chronic phase of the disorder have significantly lower scores than those who are acute. This is logical due to the similarities in executive disruptions that make everyday life difficult for those with schizophrenia and symptoms that form DES.

Patients with Alzheimer's disease and other forms of dementia have been shown to exhibit impairment in executive functioning as well. The effects of DES symptoms on the executive functions and working memory, such as attentiveness, planning and remembering recently learned things, are some of the earliest indicators of Alzheimer's disease and dementia with Lewy bodies.

Studies have also indicated that chronic alcoholism (see Korsakoff syndrome) can lead to a mild form of DES according to results of BADS.

== Causes ==
The most frequent cause of the syndrome is brain damage to the frontal lobe. Brain damage leading to the dysexecutive pattern of symptoms can result from physical trauma such as a blow to the head or a stroke or other internal trauma.

Frontal lobe damage is not the only cause of the syndrome. It has been shown that damage, such as lesions, in other areas of the brain may indirectly affect executive functions and lead to similar symptoms (e.g., ventral tegmental area, basal ganglia and thalamus). There is not one specific pattern of damage that leads to DES, as multiple affected brain structures and locations have led to the symptoms. This is one reason why the term frontal lobe syndrome is not preferred.

== Diagnosis ==
Assessment of patients with DES can be difficult because traditional tests generally focus on one specific problem for a short period of time. People with DES can do fairly well on these tests because their problems are related to integrating individual skills into everyday tasks. The lack of everyday application of traditional tests is known as low ecological validity.

=== Behavioural ===
The Behavioural Assessment of the Dysexecutive Syndrome (BADS) was designed to address the problems of traditional tests and evaluate the everyday problems arising from DES. BADS is designed around six subtests and ends with the Dysexecutive Questionnaire (DEX). These tests assess executive functioning in more complex, real-life situations, which improves their ability to predict day-to-day difficulties of DES.

The six tests are as follows:

- Rule Shift Cards – Assesses the subject's ability to ignore a prior rule after being given a new rule to follow.
- Action Program – This test requires the use of problem solving to accomplish a new, practical task.
- Key Search – This test reflects the real-life situation of needing to find something that has been lost. It assesses the patient's ability to plan how to accomplish the task and monitor their own progress.
- Temporal Judgment – Patients are asked to make estimated guesses to a series of questions such as, "how fast do racehorses gallop?". It tests the ability to make sensible guesses.
- Zoo Map – Tests the ability to plan while following a set of rules.
- Modified Six Elements – This test assesses the subject's ability to plan, organize and monitor behaviour.

The Dysexecutive Questionnaire (DEX) is a 20-item questionnaire designed to sample emotional, motivational, behavioural and cognitive changes in a subject with DES. One version is designed for the subject to complete and another version is designed for someone who is close to the individual, such as a relative or caregiver. Instructions are given to the participant to read 20 statements describing common problems of everyday life and to rate them according to their personal experience. Each item is scored on a 5-point scale according to its frequency from never (0 point) to very often (4 points).

== Treatment ==
There is no cure for individuals with DES, but there are therapies to help them cope with their symptoms. DES can affect a number of functions in the brain and vary from person to person. Because of this variance, it is suggested that the most successful therapy would include multiple methods. Researchers suggest that a number of factors in the executive functioning need to be improved, including self-awareness, goal setting, planning, self-initiation, self-monitoring, self-inhibition, flexibility, and strategic behaviour.

One method for individuals to improve in these areas is to help them plan and carry out actions and intentions through a series of goals and sub-goals. To accomplish this, therapists teach patients a three-step model called the General Planning Approach. The first step is Information and Awareness, in which the patients are taught about their own problems and shown how this affects their lives. The patients are then taught to monitor their executive functions and begin to evaluate them. The second stage, Goal Setting and Planning, consists of patients making specific goals, as well as devising a plan to accomplish them. For example, patients may decide they will have lunch with a friend (their goal). They are taught to write down which friend it may be, where they are going for lunch, what time they are going, how they will get there, etc. (sub-goals). They are also taught to make sure the steps go in the correct order. The final stage, named Initiation, Execution, and Regulation, requires patients to implement their goals in their everyday lives. Initiation can be taught through normal routines. The first step can cue the patient to go to the next step in their plan. Execution and regulation are put into action with reminders of how to proceed if something goes wrong in the behavioural script. This treatment method has resulted in improved daily executive functioning, however no improvements were seen on formal executive functioning tests.

Since planning is needed in many activities, different techniques have been used to improve this deficit in patients with DES. Autobiographical memories can be used to help direct future behaviour. You can draw on past experiences to know what to do in the future. For example, when you want to take a bus, you know from past experience that you have to walk to the bus stop, have the exact amount of change, put the change in the slot, and then you can go find a seat. Patients with DES seem to not be able to use this autobiographical memory as well as a normal person. Training for DES patients asks them to think of a specific time when they did an activity previously. They are then instructed to think about how they accomplished this activity. An example includes "how would you plan a holiday". Patients are taught to think of specific times they went on a holiday and then to think how they may have planned these holidays. By drawing on past experiences patients were better able to make good decisions and plans.

Cognitive analytic therapy (CAT) has also been used to help those with DES. Because individuals with this syndrome have trouble integrating information into their actions it is often suggested that they have programmed reminders delivered to a cell phone or pager. This helps them remember how they should behave and discontinue inappropriate actions. Another method of reminding is to have patients write a letter to themselves. They can then read the letter whenever they need to. To help patients remember how to behave, they may also create a diagram. The diagram helps organize their thoughts and shows the patient how they can change their behaviour in everyday situations.

The use of auditory stimuli has been examined in the treatment of DES. The presentation of auditory stimuli causes an interruption in current activity, which appears to aid in preventing "goal neglect" by increasing the patients' ability to monitor time and focus on goals. Given such stimuli, subjects no longer performed below their age group average IQ.

== Controversy ==
Some researchers have suggested that DES is mislabelled as a syndrome because it is possible for the symptoms to exist on their own. Also, there is not a distinct pattern of damage that leads to the syndrome. Not all patients with frontal lobe damage have DES and some patients with no damage at all to the frontal lobe exhibit the necessary pattern of symptoms. This has led research to investigate the possibility that executive functioning is broken down into multiple processes that are spread throughout the frontal lobe. Further disagreement comes from the syndrome being based on Baddeley and Hitch's model of working memory and the central executive, which is a hypothetical construct.

The vagueness of some aspects of the syndrome has led researchers to test for it in a non-clinical sample. The results show that some dysexecutive behaviours are part of everyday life, and the symptoms exist to varying degrees in everyone. For example, absent-mindedness and lapses in attention are common everyday occurrences for most people. However, for the majority of the population such inattentiveness is manageable, whereas patients with DES experience it to such a degree that daily tasks become difficult.

== See also ==
- Attention deficit hyperactivity disorder
- Executive dysfunction
- Fetal alcohol spectrum disorder
- Schizophrenia
