= Frontal lobe injury =

Type of brain injury

This image shows the four lobes of the human brain: the frontal lobe (red), the parietal lobe (orange), the temporal lobe (green), and the occipital lobe (yellow). Also shown are the insular cortex (purple), the brain stem (black), and the cerebellum (blue).

The frontal lobe of the human brain is both relatively large in mass and less restricted in movement than the posterior portion of the brain. It is a component of the cerebral system, which supports goal-directed behavior. This lobe is often cited as the part of the brain responsible for the ability to decide between good and bad choices, as well as recognize the consequences of different actions. Because of its location in the anterior part of the head, the frontal lobe is arguably more susceptible to injuries. Following a frontal lobe injury, an individual's abilities to make good choices and recognize consequences are often impaired. Memory impairment is another common effect associated with frontal lobe injuries, but this effect is less documented and may or may not be the result of flawed testing. Damage to the frontal lobe can cause increased irritability, which may include a change in mood and an inability to regulate behavior. Particularly, an injury of the frontal lobe could lead to deficits in executive function, such as anticipation, goal selection, planning, initiation, sequencing, monitoring (detecting errors), and self-correction (initiating novel responses). A widely reported case of frontal lobe injury was that of Phineas Gage, a railroad worker whose left frontal lobe was damaged by a large iron rod in 1848 (though Gage's subsequent personality changes are almost always grossly exaggerated).

== Neuropsychological effects ==
Midsagittal cross-section of a human brain. The portion in color is the left frontal lobe, damaged in Phineas Gage's accident.

=== Memory and attention ===
Patients with damaged frontal lobes often complain of minimal to substantial memory loss. Because of this, frontal lobe injuries have long been associated with memory problems, despite little evidence actually showing this relation to be true. In fact, when patients with such injuries are tested using standard memory tests, they often score within normal. Close relatives of these same patients, however, may describe substantial memory problems. The disparity occurs because it is not the memory system itself that is affected, but the functions of the frontal lobe that facilitate working memory. Working memory is closely involved with the ability to hold attention. Working memory is not simply how much information an individual can maintain in a brief period of time; this describes primary memory, and a small part of working memory relates to it. The important part of working memory is secondary memory, in which an individual retrieves information. Those with high working memory are able to perform this retrieval even when distracted by another task. Patients with damaged frontal lobes show lower working memory and, therefore, a lessened ability to retrieve information from their secondary memory.

=== Risk taking ===
An increase in impulsivity, risk taking or both is often seen in individuals following frontal lobe damage. The two related terms differ in that impulsivity is a response disinhibition, while risk taking is related to the reward-based aspects of decision-making. Put more simply, an impulsive person will make a decision quickly, without considering the consequences, leading ultimately to a lack of self-control. Contrarily, risk takers will look at the consequences but not weigh them; they will jump at the opportunity of a reward even if the likelihood of receiving that reward is slim. The increase of risk taking amongst damaged frontal lobe patients can be directly observed during gambling, and gambling tasks have been developed to measure such behavior.

== Diagnosis ==
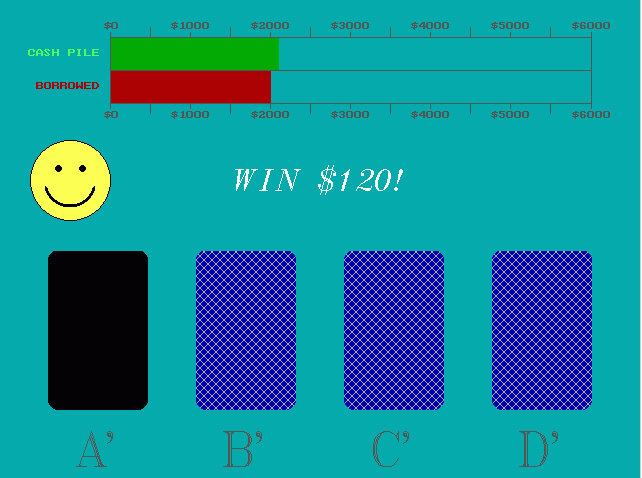
A screenshot from a computerized version of the Iowa gambling task

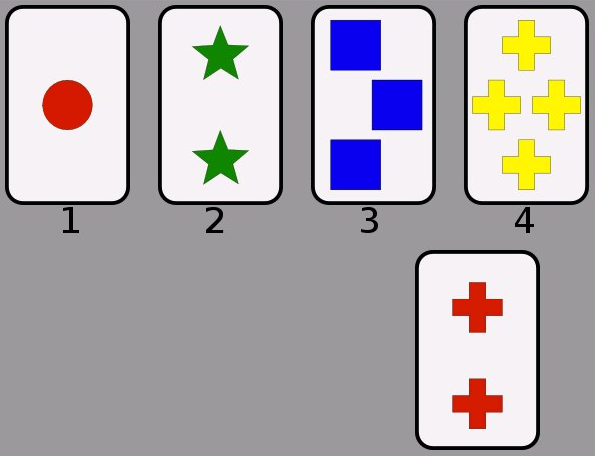
A screenshot from a computerized version of the Wisconsin Card Sorting Test.

In both forms of the saccade test, every eye movement is tracked, even small movements like the ones shown in this animation.

=== Types of tests ===
Before more advanced technology came about, scientists tested individual behavior using more low-tech means. As technology progressed, so did the tests scientists administer to evaluate a person's cognitive function.
In testing the behavioral effects of a frontal lobe injury, many of the tests are still very simple and do not involve greatly advanced technology.

==== Gambling task ====
This test has an inverse relationship between the probability of obtaining a reward and the value of the reward itself; that is to say, a low probability but a high reward or a high probability but a low reward. Thus, actual gambling skills are not being tested, but simply the preference for high reward despite the risks. In one of the ways to carry this out, a set of cards will be presented face down to the individual being tested; one of the cards would be the winning card, and all the others, losers. Cards will then be continuously removed from the pile and added back in randomly, during which time the winning card could be anywhere. Subjects being tested are told they can stop the process at any time and have the cards flipped over; if the winning card is present within the pile they win points. The catch, however, is that more points are awarded when fewer cards are present; but when fewer cards are present, the probability of the winning card being within the pile is lesser. Risk takers are those that go for the higher reward (more points), even though they are less likely to actually receive that reward. They choose a higher, less likely award, over a lower, more probable reward. Subjects that have experienced a frontal lobe injury show just such behavior when tested.

==== Wisconsin Card Sorting Test (WCST) ====
The Wisconsin Card Sorting Test (WCST) can be used in conjunction with other tests to speculate to possible dysfunction of the prefrontal cortex, the front-most area of the frontal lobe, that plays an important role in executive functioning. However, since the age of modern medicine and brain imaging, the WCST has been purported to be inaccurate and inconclusive in diagnosing frontal lobe damage.

The WCST test is supposed to specifically measure an individual's competence in abstract reasoning, and the ability to change problem-solving strategies when needed.

==== Saccade ====
A saccade is a fast movement of the eyes in a certain direction. In the most simplistic form, there are two types of saccade tests administered in which the only requirement is movement of the eye: the prosaccade and the antisaccade. In the prosaccade, participants are required to quickly look toward a point in response to some attention-catching cue, such as a flashing light. Because there are very powerful evolutionary forces that work to automatically focus attention toward prepotent (greater in power) stimuli, this type of test does not call upon an individual's executive control; therefore, the prosaccade is not relevant when testing the effects of frontal lobe damage on executive cognitive control and working memory. Conversely, the antisaccade test requires not only ignoring the flashing cue, but looking in the opposite direction. This task calls for inhibition of a prepotent response as well as planning and executing an eye movement that contradicts instinct. In the anti-saccade test, an individual has to set the goal of ignoring these instincts and continue to maintain this goal. Those with frontal lobe injuries show lower working memory, and therefore typically do not test well in the antisaccade test.

=== Flaws in Testing ===
While impulsivity and risk-taking behavior are both commonly observed following a frontal lobe injury, such traits are hard to evaluate and quantify without some degree of subjectivity. The definitions of these traits are themselves not completely straightforward, nor are they always agreed upon. As a result, the methods to measure such behaviors often differ, and this should be taken into consideration when comparing data/results from different sources. Because of this, caution should be taken in how to interpret different results.

A single test, such as the WCST, cannot be used to measure the effects of a frontal lobe injury, or the aspects of cognitive function it may affect, such as working memory; variety of tests must be used. A subject may be good at one task but show dysfunction in executive function overall. Similarly, test results can be made misleading after testing the same individual over a long period of time. The subject may get better at a task, but not because of an improvement in executive cognitive function. He/she may have simply learned some strategies for doing this particular task that made it no longer a good measurement tool.

Patients with damaged frontal lobes often complain of minimal to substantial memory loss, even though when such patients are tested using standard memory tests, they often score within normal. The disparity could be the result of the limits of these standardized tests. Just as likely, the scientific community may not be comparing the right groups of people. Little is understood about frontal lobe functions facilitating memory, but what is clear is that more in-depth research of brain injury patients is needed. Because most research compares those with brain injuries (whether frontal lobe or not) and those without, the scientific community is unsure whether certain memory impairment is specific to frontal lobe injuries, or just traumatic brain injuries in general. There are many factors to consider when examining the effects of a traumatic brain injury, such as the nature of the injury as well as its cause; but the severity of the injury seems to be most important in affecting memory impairment specific to frontal lobe damage. Those patients with a mild traumatic brain injury with frontal lobe damage seem to be only slightly affected, if affected at all.

Frontal lobe injuries have been shown to cause decreased ability in combining events that are temporally separated (separated by time), as well as recalling information in its correct context. However, standardized testing may mask or exaggerate a possible impairment because the patients are strictly regulated, as are their discretionary behaviors. Many times, these are behaviors thought to be directly related to disorders of the frontal lobe, when in fact, these patients have a different problem entirely, such as paying attention, anxiety, sleep disorder, etc.

The main conclusion that can be agreed upon is that tests should continuously be scrutinized; as society progresses, better tests should be designed. Without the proper tests to assess traumatic brain injury patients with frontal lobe damage in particular, we may be misrepresenting the functions of the frontal lobe, specifically the role it plays in memory.

== See also ==
- Frontal lobe disorder
- Gourmand syndrome
- Frontal lobotomy
- Phineas Gage, railroad construction foreman who survived a large iron rod being driven through his left frontal lobe in 1848
- Expressive aphasia
- Brain damage
- Lobotomy
