= Murder of Ramona Johari =

2005 case of a man murdering his wife at Dover Road

Ramona Johari
- Born: Ramona binte Johari c. 1967; Singapore
- Died: 4 December 2005 (aged 38); National University Hospital, Singapore
- Cause of death: Acute subdural haemorrhage
- Occupation: Production operator
- Known for: Murder victim
- Spouse: Mohammad Zam Abdul Rashid (m. 1997 – her death. 2005)
- Children: 0

On 2 December 2005, at his Dover Road flat, 44-year-old condominium caretaker Mohammad Zam Abdul Rashid attacked and severely assaulted his 38-year-old wife Ramona Johari (a production operator) after he accused her of getting close to a colleague. Ramona died from the assault two days later in hospital, and for having battered his wife to death, Mohammad Zam was charged with murder, but after he was diagnosed to be suffering from frontal lobe syndrome at the time of the offence, which caused him to suffer from diminished responsibility at the time of the murder, Mohammad Zam's murder charge was reduced to manslaughter. Mohammad Zam pleaded guilty and was hence jailed for life in September 2006, after the trial court found him to be a lingering menace to society and his condition required medication on a lifelong basis, as well as the sheer and relentless brutality exhibited by Mohammad Zam when he was battering his wife to death.

== Fatal assault of Ramona ==
On 2 December 2005, at about 1am, a woman was severely assaulted by her husband at their two-room matrimonial flat in Dover Road, Singapore.

During that same morning, the police responded to a report about a domestic dispute and arrived at the victim's flat, where they found 38-year-old Ramona Johari, a production operator, lying unconscious on her bed after she was brutally beaten, and she also sustained multiple injuries on her body (especially her head and face). Ramona's husband, 44-year-old condominium caretaker Mohammad Zam Abdul Rashid, was arrested as a suspect for the brutal assault, which he claimed to have done so after he allegedly seen his wife getting too close to another man, and he had to be restrained while the paramedics tended to his wife. Inside the flat itself, a 13-year-old boy, who was Ramona's nephew, was also present and had witnessed the assault. While tending to Ramona, paramedics found massive amounts of dried blood on Ramona's mouth and seven of her broken teeth next to her, and Ramona also sustained multiple bruises on her face, especially at her eyes. A paramedic officer additionally discovered a large bruise over the left side of her head, and it was deformed.

Ramona was subsequently rushed to National University Hospital (NUH) for immediate treatment. Further check-ups revealed that Ramona was bleeding from the gums and had several loose teeth, and a CT scan showed that she had acute right subdural haematoma and required emergency craniectomy (meaning removal of the skull). Through surgery, a huge part of Ramona's skull was removed and some of the bleeding were stopped, and the doctors also injected propofol and morphine to reduce Ramona's pain while she was in a comatose state. Still, Ramona remained in critical condition, and she never regained consciousness. On 4 December 2005, two days after the attack, Ramona died at the age of 38. An autopsy report later showed that the cause of Ramona's death was acute subdural haemorrhage, and signs of bronchopneumonia were also detected. Fractured ribs were also discovered during the autopsy. As a result of Ramona's death, the case was re-classified as murder.

During the same month, the funeral of Ramona took place, and it was reported that the relatives of both Mohammad Zam and Ramona were both saddened and outraged at the death of Ramona, and Ramona's nephew, who was not named since he was a minor, remained traumatized at the violent attack that ultimately taken the life of his aunt. Mohammad Zam's younger brother also told reporters that his late sister-in-law was a good person and she often cared for his well-being, and he regretted leaving the flat on the night of the assault. He also added that Ramona was a dutiful wife who often waited up for his elder brother. Ramona's nephew was also interviewed in July 2007 (the same month of Mohammad Zam's trial) to speak about his traumatic experience of seeing his uncle battering his aunt to death.

The case of Ramona's murder brought shock to the public, and it led to a public discussion on domestic violence between husband and wife; some other married women also spoke up about their past experiences of spousal abuse in light of the murder. Government data revealed that in 2004, the Family Court granted 3,200 personal protection orders (PPO), and in the first nine months of 2005, there were 1,900 PPOs granted.

== Criminal charges ==
After his arrest for the assault of Ramona, Mohammad Zam, then 44 years old, was charged with causing grievous hurt. Upon the death of Ramona two days since the assault, Mohammad Zam was brought back to court a second time and charged with murder on 6 December 2005. As Singaporean law allowed the death penalty for murder, Mohammad Zam faced the possibility of a death sentence should he be found guilty of murder. He was also remanded for psychiatric evaluation. Mohammad Zam reportedly requested for the judge to allow him to see his wife one last time.

This was not Mohammad Zam's first brush with the law. In 1981, Mohammad Zam was fined S$2,000 for theft, and he also paid a second fine of S$2,000 in 1990 for unlawfully possessing someone else's identity card. A decade later, Mohammad Zam was charged in court for three counts of molestation, and he was sentenced in August 2000 to serve 18 months' jail and received six strokes of the cane after he was convicted of two molestation charges. Aside from this, Mohammad Zam had also undergone several stints at drug rehabilitation centres due to drug addiction.

In June 2006, on the grounds of diminished responsibility (which was not revealed until the trial), Mohammad Zam's original charge of murder was reduced to a lesser offence of culpable homicide not amounting to murder, also known as manslaughter in Singaporean legal terms, and this amendment of the charge allowed Mohammad Zam to escape the death penalty for murdering Ramona. The possible punishment available for manslaughter was either life imprisonment or up to ten years in jail, in addition to a possible fine or caning.

== Official version of the murder ==
The following was the official version of the murder of Ramona Johari (and the events before and after the crime), based on Mohammad Zam's confession, the witness statements of Ramona's nephew and other facts uncovered during the police investigations.

Prior to the murder, Mohammad Zam and Ramona had been married for eight years with no children. This was not Mohammad Zam's first marriage as he had an ex-wife and teenage son who were not in contact with him, and he lived together with his wife, his younger brother Abdul Rahim (a divorcee) and the 13-year-old nephew of Ramona at their Dover Road flat. Sources reveal that Mohammad Zam, who was educated up to primary six, was the fourth out of seven children in his family and had a twin brother Ramziz, but he was estranged from most of his siblings. Mohammad Zam's parents died several years before he murdered his wife.

On the night of 1 December 2005, hours before the murder, Ramona returned home from work as usual, preparing dinner for her nephew and younger brother-in-law, before they watched television together, and Ramona was eventually left alone watching television after the nephew and brother-in-law went to bed. Mohammad Zam, however, was not present at home at that time, and he returned hours later after a drinking session with his friend. Mohammad Zam reportedly accused Ramona of having gotten close to a colleague and even shouted expletives at her, and it caused Ramona to cry. The commotion awakened Ramona's nephew, and according to the teenager, he witnessed Mohammad Zam slapping and punching Ramona, who was sitting near to him, and he saw Mohammad Zam grabbing an alarm clock (weighing 200g) and slammed it onto Ramona's face, causing Ramona to bleed and she continued to plead to her husband, who continued punching her. Afterwards, Mohammad Zam picked up a floor fan (weighing 8.5 kg) with both hands and threw it onto his wife’s face while she was still sitting on the floor. Ramona managed to escape the bedroom thereafter and hid inside the kitchen toilet, but Mohammad Zam broke the door and entered the bathroom, dragging his wife out and resumed punching and slapping her head and face while spewing vulgarities at her. All the while, Ramona never resisted and she continued to plead to her husband to stop, but Mohammad Zam persisted in the assault.

Ramona managed to run out of the bedroom into the living room and sat down on a sofa, but Mohammad Zam pursued her and grabbed onto her neck, and this time round, he picked up an ironing board weighing about 4.5 kg, and smashed it onto her head, before he forcibly dragged her back into the bedroom. By then, Ramona was motionless and during the whole sequence of events, Ramona's nephew was witnessing every minute of the cruel and violent attack on his aunt, and Mohammad Zam's brother left the flat in the middle of the assault. Both Mohammad Zam's brother and Ramona's nephew did not intervene due to Mohammad Zam warning the both of them to not intervene whenever he and his wife had any disputes, and the nephew was also afraid of Mohammad Zam and frightened at the violence that happened in front of him. Later, Mohammad Zam called the teenager to come out and bring Ramona to bed, and the nephew found his aunt's face covered in blood and she looked weak, and she did not respond to his attempts to wake her up. Throughout this, Mohammad Zam only stood by and watched. The attack in total lasted for about 40 minutes.

By then, the neighbours were alerted to the commotion happening inside Mohammad Zam's flat, and one of them called the police. This eventually led to Mohammad Zam's arrest for battering his wife, who would ultimately die two days later from the injuries caused by her husband.

== Trial of Mohammad Zam Abdul Rashid ==
=== Plea of guilt and psychiatric evidence ===
Mohammad Zam Abdul Rashid
- Born: Mohammad Zam bin Abdul Rashid; 1961 (age 64–65); Colony of Singapore
- Occupation: Condominium caretaker (former)
- Spouse(s): Unnamed first wife (divorced); Ramona Johari (m. 1997 – her death. 2005)
- Children: 1 son (first marriage)
- Status: Imprisoned at Changi Prison since 2 December 2005
- Convictions: 1981; Theft (one count); 1990; Possessing someone else's identity card (one count); 2000; Molestation (two counts); 2006; Manslaughter (one count)
- Criminal charges: 1981; Theft (one count); 1990; Possessing someone else's identity card (one count); 2000; Molestation (three counts); 2005; Murder (one count)
- Penalty: 1981; S$2000 fine 1990; S$2000 fine 2000; 18 months' imprisonment and six strokes of the cane 2006; Life imprisonment

On 17 July 2006, 45-year-old Mohammad Zam Abdul Rashid officially stood trial at the High Court for one count of manslaughter, and his nephew, whose identity remained a secret due to his age, was expected to be the prosecution's key witness during the trial. Mohammad Zam was represented by Andy Yeo, Lim Dao Kai and Jesslyn Chia, while the prosecution consisted of Imran Abdul Hamid and Muhamad Imaduddien. The trial was presided over by Justice Tay Yong Kwang. Mohammad Zam pleaded guilty to the manslaughter charge on the first day of his trial, and therefore, he was convicted as charged, and the sentencing trial of Mohammad Zam was scheduled to take place on 18 August 2006, although this was postponed to 12 September 2006.

Before rendering sentence on Mohammad Zam, the trial judge allowed the psychiatric evidence to be presented for the purposes of calibrating the appropriate punishment for the accused. Dr Stephen Phang, a government psychiatrist who was engaged by the prosecution, testified that Mohammad Zam was suffering from frontal lobe syndrome, a type of personality disorder that affected one's behavioural patterns, induced by a head injury that he suffered in 1987 after falling down a flight of stairs. The disorder causes one to have an inability to cope with his anger or exhibit bizarre behaviours, and hence substantially impaired Mohammad Zam's mental responsibility at the time of the killing. Dr Phang cited that Mohammad Zam's disorder was the reason behind his occasional inappropriate sexual advances towards his wife and the molestation charges he was convicted for back in 2000, and his berserk behaviour and brutal attack of Ramona was also exacerbated by the alcohol intake and intoxication he sustained prior to the case. Dr Phang also testified that despite the disorder, Mohammad Zam still retained his awareness that his actions were likely to cause the harm he inflicted on her and the death of Ramona, and he added that the severity of Mohammad Zam's condition was so much so that he needed to rely on medication for the rest of his life and he still posed as an imminent danger to himself and people around him.

In return, the defence's psychiatric expert, Dr Lim Yun Chin (Y C Lim) did not deny that Mohammad Zam suffered from frontal lobe syndrome, and he agreed that the head injury sustained by Mohammad Zam in 1987 was the direct cause of the disorder, and he testified that Mohammad Zam did not have the knowledge of such a disorder that developed in an "insidious" way and also took a toll on his personality. Dr Lim testified that Mohammad Zam's condition could still improve with consistent treatment in spite of the irreversible nature of the disorder, and he could still be entrusted to continue with his treatment even if he was left to his devices.

=== Closing submissions ===
The prosecution sought the maximum sentence of life imprisonment in their closing submissions. They argued that Mohammad Zam had displayed excessive violence and the circumstances of the homicide was extremely grave, abhorrent and deplorable enough to warrant a long custodial sentence, and Mohammad Zam still psychiatrically remained as a danger to society due to his condition and consequent unpredictability and impulsivity. The prosecution also submitted that Mohammad Zam did not have strong familial support as his relationship with his siblings were estranged and none of them had the financial capability to take care of him or ensure that Mohammad Zam was compliant to his medical treatment, and he had a history of drug and alcohol abuse, which added to the possibility that Mohammad Zam would not commit himself fully to treatment and rehabilitation. As such, the prosecution pressed for a life sentence in Mohammad Zam's case.

On the other hand, the defence objected to the imposition of a life sentence, stating that the death of Ramona was not pre-planned and he had actually consumed twice the normal intake of alcohol he could consume and handle, and he had not committed any violent offences in the past despite his conviction for molestation and other various crimes, and Mohammad Zam was remorseful for killing his wife, with whom he shared a good relationship for 17 years and his loss was deeply felt as the rest of his kin did. They argued that Mohammad Zam's disorder was the basis of his previous crime of molestation and the present offence of killing Ramona, and he himself was unaware of the frontal lobe syndrome up until he was arrested and psychiatrically assessed. While the defence conceded that the nature of the crime was deplorable and definitely warranted a lengthy jail term, they argued that there should be leniency exercised for Mohammad Zam, and he expressed that he would stay away from alcohol for the rest of his life and he would undergo the necessary treatment even when left to his own devices upon his release, although the familial support in Mohammad Zam's case may not be as forthcoming due to the enstranged relationship between Mohammad Zam and his six siblings. In conclusion, the defence asked for Mohammad Zam to serve not more than ten years in prison instead of life.

=== Sentencing ===
On 12 September 2006, Justice Tay Yong Kwang delivered his verdict on sentence. Justice Tay directed his attention to the merciless and relentless nature of the attack, where Mohammad Zam, in a fit of maniac-like rage, had viciously battered Ramona within an inch of her life like she was his "most bitter enemy", and while the judge accepted it was indeed unfortunate that Mohammad Zam committed the act while under the influence of an unnoticed psychiatric condition, Justice Tay opined that Mohammad Zam's actions should be weighed against the need for safety in society, and he found the claim of Ramona seeing another man as a "lame excuse" to explain Mohammad Zam's conduct and reason behind the lethal attack, and he also stated there was no provocation whatsoever from Ramona to warrant any of Mohammad Zam's anger and subsequent deprivation of her life in cold blood. Justice Tay stated it was an inherently clear case where a person, in Mohammad Zam's position, had an unstable mental condition which induced him into causing "vicious volatility against even the person closest to him, someone who was not even resisting his attack but who was constantly begging him to stop."

Justice Tay also described the fatal assault as a "running, bloody battle" where Mohammad Zam had persisted in his pursuit of Ramona throughout the whole flat and even took to every lengths to batter his defenceless wife to death. Justice Tay also admonished Mohammad Zam for his lack of remorse, which was demonstrated by his decision to not immediately render any medical assistance for his wife, and it further cemented his status as a dangerous individual to society in the present and near future. Justice Tay additionally cited that Mohammad Zam did not have a solid network of familial support, since he was already 45 years old and his siblings, who were not close to him and also getting on in years, might not be able to juggle between supervising Mohammad Zam and taking care their own families, and there was a low possibility that Mohammad Zam would remain committed to treatment and medication in his post-release future. On the aspect of familial support, Justice Tay heavily referenced the case of Constance Chee Cheong Hin, who was sentenced to 13 years in prison for the wrongful abduction and manslaughter of her boyfriend's daughter. In Chee's case, her three sisters submitted a sworn affidavit and promised they would take care of Chee upon her release and constantly monitor her condition. One of Chee's sisters also made arrangements for Chee to live together with her permanently once Chee completed her sentence. In contrast to Chee's case, Mohammad Zam did not have strong familial support, and based on this ground and other aggravating circumstances of the case, Justice Tay concluded that Mohammad Zam should be isolated from society for the longest period possible for the sake of protecting the public at large and found it appropriate to mete out the maximum custodial sentence available.

Therefore, 45-year-old Mohammad Zam Abdul Rashid was sentenced to life imprisonment, and the sentence was ordered to commence from the date of Mohammad Zam's arrest on 2 December 2005; Mohammad Zam was spared the cane due to his psychiatric condition. Mohammad Zam, who was emotionless when sentence was passed, had a right to appeal within a 14-day period after the date of his sentencing, and he expressed his intent to appeal. Mohammad Zam's family were reportedly saddened to hear that he would be locked away for life, while Ramona's relatives were all relieved to hear that Mohammad Zam would be spending the rest of his life in prison. Additionally, news reports also revealed that Mohammad Zam tried writing to his mother-in-law Mesmah Mohd Amin and sought forgiveness for having killed her daughter, but Mesmah remained full of hatred towards her son-in-law and could not forgive him for having murdered her daughter in cold blood, and Mesmah was still heartbroken over the loss of her daughter and could not let go, and she still held on to the clothes last worn by Ramona before her death.

In accordance with the landmark ruling of Abdul Nasir Amer Hamsah's appeal on 20 August 1997, life imprisonment in Singapore was construed as a term of incarceration that lasts the remainder of one's natural life. Previous laws before the date of the ruling decreed that a life term was equivalent to a fixed jail term of twenty years. The legal change was applicable to criminal cases that were committed after 20 August 1997. Since the manslaughter of Ramona Johari occurred on 2 December 2005, about eight years and three months after the legal reform, Mohammad Zam was to be imprisoned for the remainder of his whole life behind bars.

== Mohammad Zam's appeal ==
On 25 January 2007, Mohammad Zam appealed to the Court of Appeal against his life term, and his lawyers submitted that the trial judge was erred in sentencing Mohammad Zam to life in prison by finding that he had a lack of familial support. Mohammad Zam made an application for further evidence to be adduced and considered for the purpose of the appeal, as his three brothers - Anwar, Aris and Ramziz - wrote to the court that they wanted to help supervise Mohammad Zam and ensure that he adhered to his medical treatment, and the defence counsel also made use of this to show that Mohammad Zam's family had a renewed commitment to help Mohammad Zam. Mohammad Zam's counsel also submitted that it was manifestly excessive to commit Mohammad Zam to incarceration for life, since he himself was unaware that he had frontal lobe syndrome prior to the attack and did not have any opportunity to seek treatment, which would have made this tragedy avoidable. They also stated that with the influence of alcohol intoxication, Mohammad Zam's outburst of anger was further aggravated as a result and it caused his wife to die.

In rebuttal, the prosecution argued that Mohammad Zam's family did not appear to be united and during the time of his imprisonment, only two of Mohammad Zam's brothers visited him. They also pointed out that the appellant himself had attacked his wife, who was his primary caregiver, in a relentless manner while under the lack of provocation from Ramona. Therefore, the prosecution submitted that Mohammad Zam's life sentence should be upheld, since he posed as a potential danger to himself and his own family.

The Court of Appeal's three-judge panel, consisting of three High Court judges Choo Han Teck, Woo Bih Li and Kan Ting Chiu, meted out their ruling and rejected the appeal on the same day of hearing. In their full grounds of decision dated 23 February 2007, the three judges unanimously agreed with the prosecution that Mohammad Zam's relationship with his family were not close, and hence the familial support that could be provided to Mohammad Zam in assisting with his rehabilitation was inadequate, and they thus rejected the affidavits submitted by Mohammad Zam's three brothers. Justice Choo, who pronounced the decision, cited that the seriousness of the offence and manner of the attack were among the other factors (aside from the lack of familial support) that persuaded the appellate court to uphold the original trial judge Tay Yong Kwang's decision to impose the life sentence on Mohammad Zam. As a result, the Court of Appeal dismissed Mohammad Zam's appeal, and confirmed the sentence of life imprisonment in his case.

== Aftermath ==
In the aftermath of the case, the case of Mohammad Zam and his diagnosis of frontal lobe syndrome that went unnoticed brought about a significant amount of public attention and discussion about the illness and the case. While some felt that there should be compassion exercised to mentally ill people, others felt that mental illnesses were not excuses for offenders to commit crimes, especially grave offences like rape and murder, and the law should run its course. Some members of the public felt that life imprisonment was a fair sentence in Mohammad Zam's case.

In 2011, four years after the Court of Appeal confirmed Mohammad Zam's life sentence, Singaporean crime show In Cold Blood re-enacted the murder of Ramona Johari and aired it as the tenth episode of the show's first season. Although the facts of the case remained faithful to the real life events, Mohammad Zam, Ramona, and Ramona's nephew had their names changed in the episode to protect their identities and out of privacy; Mohammad Zam was renamed as Riduan while Ramona was renamed as Siti, and Ramona's nephew, who was the key witness of the murder, was given the alias "Johari".

Since December 2005, Mohammad Zam has been serving his life sentence at Changi Prison. Although he was to remain behind bars for the rest of his life, Mohammad Zam is still entitled to the possibility of parole after he completed at least 20 years out of his natural life jail term, provided that he maintained good behaviour behind bars and was no longer deemed a threat to society.

== See also ==
- Life imprisonment in Singapore
- List of major crimes in Singapore
