= Children's use of information =

Children's use of information is an issue in ethics and child development. Information is learned from many different sources and source monitoring (see also source-monitoring error) is important in understanding how people use information and decide which information is credible.

Consider the example of a parent whose child has been diagnosed with hyperactivity; the parent searches the internet for information, reads books, participates in an online chat room with other parents in the same situation, and consults various medical professionals. Some of these sources will be credible (contain reliable information), and others will not. To be well-informed, the parent must filter information according to the reliability of the source. Children learn about the world in much the same way. They are told things by numerous people (e.g., teachers, parents, siblings, and friends), see things on the television or internet, and read information in books. Can children be effective consumers of information? At what age are they able to do this? How do they deal with ambiguous resources? This page will detail answers to those questions (and others) by drawing on peer-reviewed scientific research.

== The development of source monitoring ==
Young children have more difficulty with understanding and recalling the sources of information than adults do. Although episodic memory improves throughout childhood, development in the area of source monitoring tends to occur between the ages of 3 and 8 years. At 3 years, children who are able to immediately recognize the source of the information they obtain have difficulty recalling this information after a short delay. The development of source monitoring is gradual, and children achieve and display competency in certain aspects of source monitoring before others. The developmental trajectory of source monitoring provides insight into what cognitive factors are necessary prerequisites. While there is no generally accepted unified theory for the development of source monitoring, five major theories contribute ideas about how source monitoring develops in children: source monitoring theory, fuzzy-trace theory, schema theory, person-based perspective, and the mental-state reasoning model.

=== Source monitoring theory ===
According to source monitoring theory, the source of information is attributed through a decision-making process, where source is inferred based on various characteristics inherent in the memory itself. This means that the sources are not directly encoded, but rather reconstructed, when information is recalled. This decision-making process can either be through automatic, unconscious processing, or through heightened demanding and systematic processing that may require reasoning, and the retrieval of supporting memories. This theory implicates the development of episodic memory and memory strategies in the development of source monitoring more generally.

=== Fuzzy-trace theory ===
Fuzzy-trace theory hypothesizes that the source-monitoring errors that children make are caused by problems with memory storage and retrieval. Memories are simultaneously stored in two different formats: the "gist" level (extracted from the experience), and the "verbatim" representation (information in exact detail). It is proposed that the source of information is encoded in memory as a verbatim detail. Memories for verbatim details decay more quickly over time than gist representations, and young children demonstrate faster decay of verbatim information than older children or adults. Younger children are more likely to experience memory intrusions due to weaker memory traces, which leads to a susceptibility to misleading information replacing memory traces from a previous event. For this reason, developmental changes in episodic memory performance are viewed as the driving factor in source monitoring development.

=== Schema theory ===
Schema theory, as a derivative of script theory, states that after repeated exposure to similar events, individuals form a general representation of what typically happens. Some details are the same at each instance of repeated events, and others can vary from instance to instance. In the script for what usually happens, there is a "slot" for each variable detail and the detail for a particular time is chosen from a list of possible variations. If source information is encoded as a slot, errors in source monitoring can be the result of incorrect retrieval of a specific detail. This framework allows for the storage of a large amount of detailed information about specific events, however is very cognitively demanding for children. Because of their limited cognitive resources, young children require more experience with repeated events in order to generate a schema. Details that vary from instance to instance can be lost, and children rely instead on the generalized event representation when attempting to recall a particular instance. The main assumption is that the development of source monitoring depends on an increase in cognitive processing capacity.

=== Person-based perspective ===
Person-based perspective emphasizes prospective processes. Prospective processes relate actions to one another through operations such as sequencing and planning. These processes are affected by the perspective taken (self vs. other) or the goals and meaning to the individual. The meaning attached to the goal of an action can interfere with source monitoring by removing attention from the source details. The person-based perspective is social-cognitive in nature (more so than other theories of source monitoring) and assumes that development is reliant on socialization and theory of mind development.

=== Mental-state reasoning model ===
The mental-state reasoning model highlights possible mechanisms behind young children's suggestibility. Children who have difficulty with reasoning about conflicting mental representations are likely to overwrite their original memories with misinformation because they cannot reconcile two contradicting views of what actually occurred. Source monitoring and the understanding of knowledge states, play a key role in resisting suggestions. The development of source monitoring is presumed to be based on better understanding of knowledge states, metacognition and theory of mind.

== The origins of knowledge ==
Being aware of how we have acquired information is particularly difficult for young children (specifically 3- to 5-year-olds). After feeling a soft ball, 3- and 4-year-olds can correctly identify whether they know the ball is soft or hard, but cannot always say how they know. Perhaps it is because they felt the ball, saw the ball, or were told it was soft. The ability to recognize the origin of their knowledge requires the understanding of how knowledge is acquired.

=== Knowledge and justification ===
When asked knowledge questions ("Do you know what is in the box?") then justification questions ("How do [or why don't] you know what is in the box?"), children who can correctly answer are able to reflect on knowledge that they have gained from a particular source and should be able to identify the source of information.

3- and 4-year-olds are better at answering these questions when the questions refer to themselves in comparison to referring to another person. When these children are shown a hidden object they can correctly report their perceptual access (responding correctly to "Did you look into the box?") and their knowledge access of what is in the box (responding correctly to "Do you know [not know] what is in the box?"). Despite their ability to answer correctly when referring to the self, 3- and 4-year-olds have difficulty responding to the "other's" knowledge, where they deny the "other" has the knowledge. 3- and 4-year-olds can correctly identify that the other person has in fact looked in a box, but when asked "Does [other] know what is in the box?" the child will deny that the other person knows what is in the box. The key assumption is then that although children are aware that perceptual access is needed, they are unable to acknowledge that the knowledge was gained from perceptual access.

=== Gaining knowledge through looking, touching, and asking ===
Gaining knowledge is knowing how to acquire new information. The ability to recognize how specific knowledge can be gained by perceptual access (looking, feeling or smelling) is the understanding of Aspectuality. Aspectuality understanding is the awareness that an object is made up of many different properties (colour, weight, odour), which can be determined by a specific perceptual action (looking, feeling, smelling). Identifying the colour of a car outside the window could involve asking someone for the information or looking out the window. In most cases, adults would acquire this knowledge from simply looking out the window. However, not all information can be gained in this manner. If you were asked to find out how old the driver of the car is, simply looking would not provide accurate information; you would have to ask. These two situations are dependent on whether the information being sought out is visible or invisible (respectively). Knowledge development depends on children's ability to efficiently pursue their informational goal. Children do not always make the most effective or efficient decision when acquiring new information.

==== Age differences ====
6-year-olds are able to distinguish when gaining knowledge requires looking (the information is visible) or when gaining knowledge requires asking (the information is invisible). However, 4-year-olds do not perform as consistently. Even with an expert present, 4-year-olds will overestimate the knowledge they can gain through looking. However, when the information to be gained is regarding a group of friends and the expert is a friend of the group, 4-year-olds tend to overestimate knowledge acquisition through asking.

When given access to pairs of objects, which could either be identified by seeing (identical objects: different in colour) or by touch/feeling (identical objects: 1 soft, 1 hard), children perform relatively well, generally recognizing when they have adequate information and when they have inadequate information (i.e., knowing the object is blue after seeing it or knowing the object is soft after feeling it). But, when young children are not given access (of seeing or feeling), they have difficulty predicting and identifying which mode of access would allow them to identify the object. In this case, 3- and 4-year-olds overestimate the knowledge that could be gained through feeling the object. 3- and 4-year-olds may not understand the perceptual access needed to acquire the specific knowledge.

=== Language and question phrasing ===
Waters and Beck (2012) state "understanding the link between perceptual access and consequent information (knowledge access) is a crucial component in the development of theory of mind". In a typical adult population, change in the phrasing of a particular question would not affect the understanding of what action needs to occur. "What colour is the bike that is outside?" or "Is the bike red?" should not change the action of looking to gain the needed information. However, children's performance is susceptible to this type of question phrasing. There are language effects on knowledge access through 3 different question types:

1. Identity: "Find out which one is in the tunnel",
2. Dimension: "Find out what colour the one in the tunnel is"
3. Aspect: "Find out if the one in the tunnel is the red one or the blue one".

4- and 5-year-olds are more likely to respond correctly to aspect and dimension questions in comparison to identity questions. Aspect and dimension questions are more explicit, which may be why performance is better in these categories. Identity questions require more cognitive effort as one has to remember how the objects were similar and how they differed.

== Judging the credibility of sources and understanding of trust ==
Much of people's knowledge about the world is not obtained from direct experience, but indirectly from what other people or sources tell them. With widespread use of the internet people have access to nearly unlimited sources of information. Some of that information might be conflicting, and different sources of information vary in their accuracy and credibility. People can also deliberately deceive, be misunderstood, or be mistaken. It is important that people develop the necessary skills to assess the accuracy of what they are being told.

=== Adults' credibility judgments ===
Adults make credibility judgments based on two factors: expertise and trustworthiness. For example, we might trust information from published research articles more than information from blogs because we know that anyone can write a blog, but scientists (experts) who write peer-reviewed articles are highly trained. With regards to trustworthiness, adults are less likely to believe someone who they think is trying to deceive them, and they take into account the intentions of the information-provider. For example, if someone's intention is to sell you something, you might be more skeptical of the accuracy of the information they provide because their motives cause you to question their honesty. Adults can effectively use these cues to make judgments about the credibility of different sources, but whether children can also do so is an important area for research.

=== Children's ability to make credibility judgments ===
Even very young children show an early sensitivity to issues of source credibility. By the age of 4, children show similar patterns to adults in a preference for perception over testimony; that is, they would rather see something with their own eyes than be told about it. Children also feel more confident in their knowledge when they have directly perceived it than if they have been told by someone else, even if the speaker is well informed. However, children are not always able to directly perceive information, and they learn much of what they know from others. Some people are more credible sources of information than others, so children must actively evaluate information and decide whether or not to believe it. There are many factors or cues that children, by the age of 4, take into consideration when making judgements about whether or not to trust what a person says. For instance, knowledge and experience, traits, motivations, age, and reasoning or support.

==== Credibility judgments based on knowledge and experience ====
Young children have a reputation for credulity, or believing something without having any proof that it is true. Young children often trust what adults tell them, especially when they have no prior knowledge or expectations about the topic of the testimony. Because children tend to interact with adults who are more knowledgeable than themselves, if they have no reason to believe otherwise, they will trust what adults tell them. In particular, 3-year-olds’ tendency to believe others is based on a selective bias to trust what people tell them. This selective trust is adaptive in the early years as they are learning language and their way around the world.

Children have difficulty disregarding information provided to them, even if the source has been unreliable in the past. 3-year-olds will often continue to believe what a person tells them even after being repeatedly deceived by that person, but 4-year-olds are far better able to disregard this unreliable information. 3-year-olds are better at making trust judgments when they are able to choose between two sources of knowledge, rather than deciding whether or not to believe a single person, and in this situation they are often able to choose the more reliable of two speakers. By age 4, young children take an informant's knowledge, expertise, and reliability into account in order to avoid learning from unreliable or problematic sources. They believe statements made by knowledgeable speakers more than ignorant speakers, before they can explicitly answer questions about who has access to knowledge. They also prefer to seek information from sources who have been knowledgeable in the past. 4-year-olds can spontaneously use others' past performance to guide their learning.

==== Credibility judgments based on traits and motivation ====
Almost all human institutions (e.g., family, community, business, government) are built on a foundation of trust. There are many factors that influence children's trust in people and one of the most important is honesty. There are various schools of philosophical thought that posits honesty to be morally right and lying to be morally wrong. On one end of the continuum, philosophers like Bok, Kant, and St. Augustine hold a deontological view that focuses on intrinsic duties relating to the treatment of others. In other words, telling the truth is intrinsically right and lying is intrinsically wrong. On the other end of the continuum is the utilitarian view that emphasizes the greater good, specifically with respect to the outcome of one's act. Therefore, lying and its moral implications are context dependent. In some situations, such as when being polite to spare another person's feelings, making a "prosocial lie" or deliberate false statement are endorsed.

Children consider motivation, as well as traits, when deciding whom to seek information from and whom to believe. In both Eastern and Western cultures, both adults and children adhere to the utilitarian perspective when giving moral evaluations of truths and lies in different social situations. In terms of people's characteristics, children tend to place trust in people who are honest, smart, or kind over people who are dishonest, not smart, or not kind. However, they also consider a person's intent or motivation. From age 7, children consider both honesty and benevolence when making trust judgments about other people, and older children are more likely to trust people who tell prosocial lies (to avoid hurting another person's feelings or to help another person) than young children. For younger children, honesty is more important than a person's intention. As children get older, they increasingly attend to motivation as a key factor. The relationship between telling the truth and trusting a person is stable, but when it comes to lying, children consider the motivation of the speaker when deciding whether or not to trust them.

==== Credibility judgments based on age and reliability ====
Children evaluate the credibility of a speaker by evaluating how reliable that person has been in the past and can make predictions about a speaker based on their age. Children as young as 3 years old prefer to trust an unfamiliar adult rather than an unfamiliar child. When considering both age and reliability, age is often the primary cue used to determine another's credibility. For example, 3- and 4-year-olds found adults to be more trustworthy than peers, unless the peer demonstrated greater reliability (i.e., adult incorrectly mislabelled objects, whereas peer correctly labelled them). Children also consider both the prior history of accuracy and the level of perceptual access the speaker has when they provide information. Young children spontaneously keep track of the prior history of a person's accuracy or inaccuracy (reliability) and prefer to learn from someone with a good track record. Children commonly interpret the speaker's history of inaccuracy as a lasting trait and so the speaker is considered an unreliable informant, at least within the domain they have been wrong about. However, under certain conditions, children may excuse a person's past inaccuracy and later trust that person for information. If a speaker has limited information (e.g., lack of perceptual access) in making a claim – for example, inaccurately identifying a toy while blindfolded – then children as young as 3 years old appropriately excuse their past inaccuracy especially when they are later well-informed. On the other hand, if a speaker has full access to information while making an inaccurate claim, children continue to regard him/her as unreliable.

==== Credibility judgments based on reasoning or support ====
Young children appreciate that people generally think and act sensibly when reasons are present, and they can evaluate a claim by assessing the quality of the reasoning provided. Thus, children create an epistemic profile of a person based on the quality of the reasons they offer when making a claim. As young as 3 years old, children understand the difference between weak versus strong reasoning to support a statement. Children are more likely to trust someone when strong support is provided through: reliable testimony ("My teacher told me there's a book in the bag. I think that there's a book"), looking ("Before I came here, I looked and saw a ball in the bag. I think there's a ball in there"), and inference ("It's a backpack. Backpacks hold books. I think there's a book in there"). On the other hand, desire ("I like crayons. I want there to be crayons in the bag. I think that there are crayons in there"), pretense ("I like to pretend. I'm going to pretend that there's a sandwich in the bag. I think there's a sandwich in there"), and guessing ("I don't know. I'm going to guess that there's a toy in the bag") are not viewed as strong support for a claim. Children recognize that the mental states that they and others may hold are not always reliable means for drawing specific conclusions. 3- and 4-year-olds can also choose the more reasonable of two people and continue to seek, as well as, accept new information from the more credible person (the one who had better reasons in the past).

=== Children's development of distrust ===
People are not always reliable in their provision of information and it is important to be able to differentiate between good sources and bad sources. Assessing someone's reliability is based not only on the knowledgeability of the speaker, but their motives/intentions as well. People may not always be motivated to tell the truth; instead, they may potentially lie to promote their own interest, or the interest of others. At about the age they begin preschool, children become better at distinguishing between helpful and deceptive people. 3-year-olds are not able to identify who is trying to help or trick another person and accept advice from both helpers and trickers. On the other hand, 4-year-olds are more sceptical and could differentiate between helpers and trickers, but have no preference in choosing whom to accept advice from. There may be a mismatch between knowledge and behaviour among 4-year-olds, in which they do not understand the implications of their knowledge or how to successfully apply it to their behaviour. 5-year-olds systematically preferred advice from helpers. Ultimately theory of mind, or children's understanding of mental states, is related to selective trust in helpers (versus trickers). Beginning at 5 years old, children use a person's prior history of deception to make reliability judgments about that person.

== Metacognition ==
Metacognition is an ability that allows people to think about their own thinking process, and how to use their thinking process to help themselves learn better. Metacognition includes two separate abilities: (1) knowledge of cognition and (2) regulation of cognition. Knowledge of one's thinking process is not enough to regulate an individual's behaviour, and are required to use specific strategies to help them regulate their behaviour.

=== Knowing you don't know ===
An important skill children need to learn is being able to identify when a message is incomplete and they don't have enough information to make an accurate interpretation. Being aware that an ambiguous situation has arisen is difficult for young children. Children accurately "know when they know", but often overestimate when they don't know. Children's behaviour does not seem to match their verbal ability to acknowledge their "lack of knowledge". Despite incorrectly stating that they "know" something, children are still capable of changing their response upon hearing contradicting information to an initial interpretation and/or event. Language plays an important role in children's accuracy in assessing their own knowledge. For children to accurately "know what they know" it is important for them to understand the various meanings of the word "know" as well as language used to describe certainty and uncertainty.

=== Children's processing of ignorant and ambiguous statements ===
Ambiguous information is "a piece of information (word, message, or view) with multiple interpretations". Adults not only have the awareness to spot ambiguity, but they also have ways to deal with it. But young children cannot do the same. Typically, children cannot successfully deal with ambiguous statements until they are 6 or 7 years old. However, it seems in certain contexts with certain tasks, younger children also can somewhat deal with unclear or ambiguous statements.

=== The role of language and prior experience ===
Language can affect whether one can correctly deal with ambiguous statements. One can "know" someone in many different ways, for example, seeing them, talking to them, having a prior history with them, having a relationship with them, etc. This makes questions like "Do you know?" very complex and hard to answer. Clearer definitions of "to know" seem to help children to check their own knowledge better. Children as young as 4 years old could make far more accurate statements about their actual knowledge when a question was phrased "Have you heard of" rather than "Do you know". By the age of 6, children typically could accurately check their knowledge with very little impact on their future answers regardless of the language used. 4- and 5-year-olds, on the other hand, were so changeable that the phrase used affected their future answers. 4- and 5-year-olds were also less likely to overestimate their knowledge of a target person if the starting question was phrased "Have you heard of" rather than "Do you know". Not only can responses from children be altered by the question’s phrasing, but they can also change their response when the question suggests they are not familiar with the person. In a study where children were asked if they really knew who a specific person was (between 2 pictures of people they had never seen before), they were more accurate in assessing that they didn't know when it was suggested that the target person had never been to their before. While experience is important, children tend not to over-rely on prior experiences and only use it when they've had enough experience that can help assess their knowledge.

=== Partial information ===
Sometimes when confronted with ambiguous information, more than one piece of information is required to make and accurate interpretation. For example, in a study where children had to pick one of four pictures presented to them after hearing ambiguous information, they were capable of making tentative interpretations and then correctly changing their interpretations upon hearing contradicting, clarifying information. This strategy uses multiple pieces of information and has been seen in children as young as 15 months old. In situations where only partial information is available, young children make the best interpretation possible with the information given and go on to change this interpretation only when contradicting information emerges.

=== Delaying interpretation ===
Clarifying (disambiguating) information is not always instantly available. In these situations, adults seem to delay interpretation and seek clarifying information when appropriate. Children find it harder to understand what actions they need to take to clarify than to identify an ambiguous situation that pops up. There are 2 different types of delay in interpreting ambiguous information: one that is intentional and one that is instinctual. The decision to delay interpretation and seek further information is a difficult one as it involves being aware that the information given at that point are not sufficient and knowing how to ask for the ones necessary for clarification. Children are typically failures in this process until the age of 7. However, when this explicit decision to delay is simplified, children aged 5 and up showed some ability in successfully choosing to delay their response. While the ability to intentionally delay interpretation seems to be difficult, the ability to delay interpretation instinctively seems to be easier for young children. In one example, children were asked to stamp the correct snowman once they knew which one it was. Their knowledge of the correct snowman was based on a researcher slowly revealing the target snowman. The children's cards contained snowmen that differed by some feature visible on the 2nd half of the snowman only and therefore the children were required to wait until the 2nd half of the snowman was revealed in order to accurately assess which snowman was the correct one. In this scenario focusing on instinct, children as young as 5 were able to accurately delay interpretation. Therefore, while it is difficult for children to explicitly demonstrate their awareness of an ambiguous situation and how to resolve it, they are implicitly able to handle situations in which delaying interpretation may be beneficial.

=== Referents and meaning ===
It is difficult for younger children to grasp the idea that objects can be referred to in different ways and that people can have partial knowledge of the different references (i.e. a "bouncy ball" might also be referred to as a "rubber sphere"). A child might know by looking that a toy is a toy truck, but they may not be aware that the toy truck is also a present. Referential opacity is the concept of whether or not referring to an object changes its meaning. If something is referentially transparent (substitution insensitive), altering the referent term does not alter the meaning, and something that is referentially opaque (substitution sensitive) means that altering the referent term would alter the meaning. An example of this is a study with a puppet named Heinz. There is a ball in a box and children are told that Heinz knows that there is a ball in the box but does not know that the ball is a present. Children are then asked substitution-insensitive questions (i.e. Does Heinz know the ball is a present? – asking, "Does Heinz know the rubber sphere is a present?" does not alter the meaning of the question) and substitution sensitive questions (i.e. Does Heinz know there's a present in the box? – asking "Does Heinz know there is a rubber sphere in the box" does alter the meaning of the question). Regardless of age, substitution-insensitive questions seem to be easier than substitution-sensitive questions. The ability to correctly answer substitution-sensitive questions improves with age. The ability to answer these types of questions is closely related to effectively evaluating ambiguous messages. Success on substitution-insensitive questions is necessary but not sufficient for success on evaluation ambiguous messages. Alternatively, success on substitution-sensitive questions is necessary and sufficient for success at evaluating ambiguous messages.

=== Physical and epistemic uncertainty ===
Children can change their interpretation of information based on the context in which the interpretation is made. Robinson and colleagues (2006) studied children's interpretation of information in two different: physical and epistemic uncertainty. Physical uncertainty occurs when an event has not yet happened, and therefore the outcome of that event has not been determined (i.e. the dice has not yet been rolled). Epistemic uncertainty occurs when an event has already occurred, but the child is not aware of the outcome of the event (i.e. the dice have been rolled, but the dice are hidden from the participant). 4- to 8-year old children have the ability to realize multiple possibilities for an event that has not yet occurred (physical uncertainty), however they do not seem to acknowledge that there are exactly the same possibilities for an event that has already happened when they don't know the outcome (epistemic uncertainty). Under the conditions of epistemic uncertainty, children simply guess one of the possibilities. Beck and colleagues (2011) propose that this happens because it is much easier to imagine the outcome during epistemic uncertainty, basically knowing that there is only one outcome. Similarly, adults also prefer to make predictions or guess in epistemic uncertainty.

=== Feeling-of-knowing (FOK) ===
Feeling-of-knowing occurs when people are unable to easily recall a memory or a fact, but they know that they learned it and are able to recognize it, such as in a multiple-choice test. Adults' accuracy of feeling-of-knowing judgments is well above chance but not nearly perfect. It seems to be the same for children as well. Lockl and Schneider (2002) did not find any developmental trends in the accuracy of feeling-of-knowing judgments. Instead, similar to adults, children's accuracy of feeling-of knowing judgments was low, but still above chance for all age groups studied (grade 1 through grade 4). Getting a child to attend to this feeling-of-knowing (through language or prompting of prior experience) is one way to assist them in more accurately assessing their actual knowledge, allowing them to handle ambiguous situations at a much younger age.

== Forensic applications ==
Children are highly susceptible to a "suggestibility effect", producing "false memories" and/or "incorrect, post-event information" (see misinformation effect) when asked to engage in memory recall. This has important implications for forensic interviewing and child witness testimony. Consider the prominent case of Kelly Michael's (see Wee Care Nursery School abuse trial), where improper interviewing techniques lead to a miscarriage of justice. In order to develop reliable and age-appropriate instruments for interviewing children, it is imperative to consider their cognitive development, verbal and mental abilities.

=== Forensic interviews and techniques ===
==== Factors that can impact disclosure ====
It is critical for a forensic interviewer to recognize their power during an interview, especially with a child witness. An interviewer can impact the course of a child's testimony in numerous ways, including:

- Eliciting "false allegations" through leading and suggestive questions
- Determining the amount of detail a child may disclose
- Prevent a child from disclosing
- Interviewer's gender may also impact the quality and details of disclosure. Children between the ages of 4 and 6 are more likely to disclose to an interviewer of the same gender.

The age of a child is also an important factor during interviewing. Younger children are more likely to provide shorter, less detailed accounts of an event in comparison to older children. Preschool children are more likely to disclose information in an "accidental way" through triggers and obvious cues, whereas older school children are more likely to make "intentional disclosures" based on the nature of the question they are asked.

==== Improper interviewing ====
There are varying techniques and extraneous factors that can influence the way a child discloses an event during child witness testimony (e.g., experiences of abuse by a parent or caregiver). There are two major types of barriers in forensic interviews: (1) improper interviewing and (2) clumsy interviewing

Improper interviewing includes forensic techniques that are considered to be "risky and ineffective". Each of the following techniques can create critically negative consequences in witness testimony and result in false allegations or the potential for a reduced conviction:

1. Use of reinforcement: If an interviewer utilizes rewards and punishments to coerce disclosure
2. Social influence: If an interviewer informs a child of another child's disclosure or recollection
3. Asking suggestive or leading questions: This can occur when an interviewer provides a child with information that has not been previously known
4. Removing the child from direct experience: For example, asking a child "what might have happened"

Clumsy interviewing involves interviews that fail to include best practices and recommended techniques. Interviewers who are not properly trained in forensic techniques can fail to follow structured interview guidelines and impact the outcome of a child's testimony and/or responses to questioning. This type of interviewing most often occurs when an interviewer lacks skill, forgets important procedures, and when there is a lack of necessary supervision.

In order to prevent improper forensic interviewing, numerous methods to reduce suggestibility and the misinformation effect have been proven effective, including: taping interviews, recording transcripts, ensuring supervision by a qualified professional, experience in working with children, training in forensic interviewing, and maintaining a comfortable, safe environment.

==== Types of interviewing ====
The cognitive interview utilizes cognitive theory as a focal point in its interview methodology. The cognitive interview, first developed in 1992 by researchers Fisher and Geiselman, was originally developed for adults and later modified for children. It utilizes two major perspectives from cognitive theory, including the "encoding specificity principle" and a "multi-component view of memory traces".

Specifically, this method utilizes four major techniques:

1. Report everything: i.e., "tell me everything you remember"
2. Context reinstatement: i.e., "think back to where you were at the time"
3. Reverse order: i.e., "now that you told me what happened, try to remember it again but this time starting at the end and recounting it in reverse chronological order"
4. Change perspective: i.e., "what would the perpetrator have seen and heard?"

The National Institute of Child Health and Human Development (NICHD) Protocol developed an investigative protocol in 2000 to create a structured interview technique for children, specifically those of child sexual abuse.

It uses the following techniques:

1. Introductory phase: This is necessary for rapport building
2. Practice in free-recall: "Tell me about your last birthday party"
3. Information about the ground rules: "It's okay to say "I don't know""
4. Open-ended questions: "Tell me why you came to talk to me"

Stepwise interview utilizes open-ended questions through a "funnel-like strategy". It is primarily used by legal professionals, and is most often used in North America. This interview begins with open-ended questions and/or free recall and slowly incorporates more focused and detailed questions.

Allegation blind interviews stress that an interviewer should refrain from gathering information prior to an interview in order to reduce suggestibility and increase interviewer patience and attentiveness. This also enhances the interviewer's ability to be non-judgmental and objective.

Truth-lie discussions are most useful prior to commencing abuse-related questioning. This method allows the interviewer to create a baseline with the child about what the "truth" is and what a "lie" is. The interviewer is encouraged to ask questions with general examples, such as "tell me a lie about this chair". This strategy has been proven to result in a less misinformed child testimony.

Touch survey was developed on the basis that "touch falls on a continuum", and is beneficial to screen for child abuse. It includes questions surrounding the child's experiences with touch (e.g., kissing, hugging, hitting), including where they have been touched and by whom. This tool might be more useful when used in conjunction with other forensic strategies.

=== Recommendations for forensic interviewing ===
Although there are varying suggestions for structured forensic interviewing, experts provide context into best practices that can significantly reduce suggestibility, false memories and the misinformation effect:

1. Interviews should be conducted in a safe, child-friendly environment.
2. A child's age should be considered when being interviewed, and practices should be modified accordingly.
3. Structured interview protocol should always be utilized.
4. Interviewers should engage in professional training when possible.
5. Ground rules are essential for the beginning of the interview so that the child is aware of the type of responses they can provide (e.g., "I don't know").

== See also ==
- Cognitive development
- Developmental psychology
- Source-monitoring error
