= Sanger Brown =

American physician

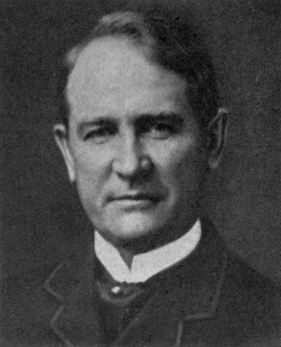
- Born: February 16, 1852; Bloomfield, Canada West
- Died: April 1, 1928 (aged 76); Chicago, Illinois, US
- Burial place: Graceland Cemetery
- Education: Bellevue Hospital Medical College
- Occupation: Physician
- Spouse: Bella Christy (m. 1885)
- Children: 1

Sanger Monroe Brown (February 16, 1852 – April 1, 1928) was an American physician.

== Biography ==
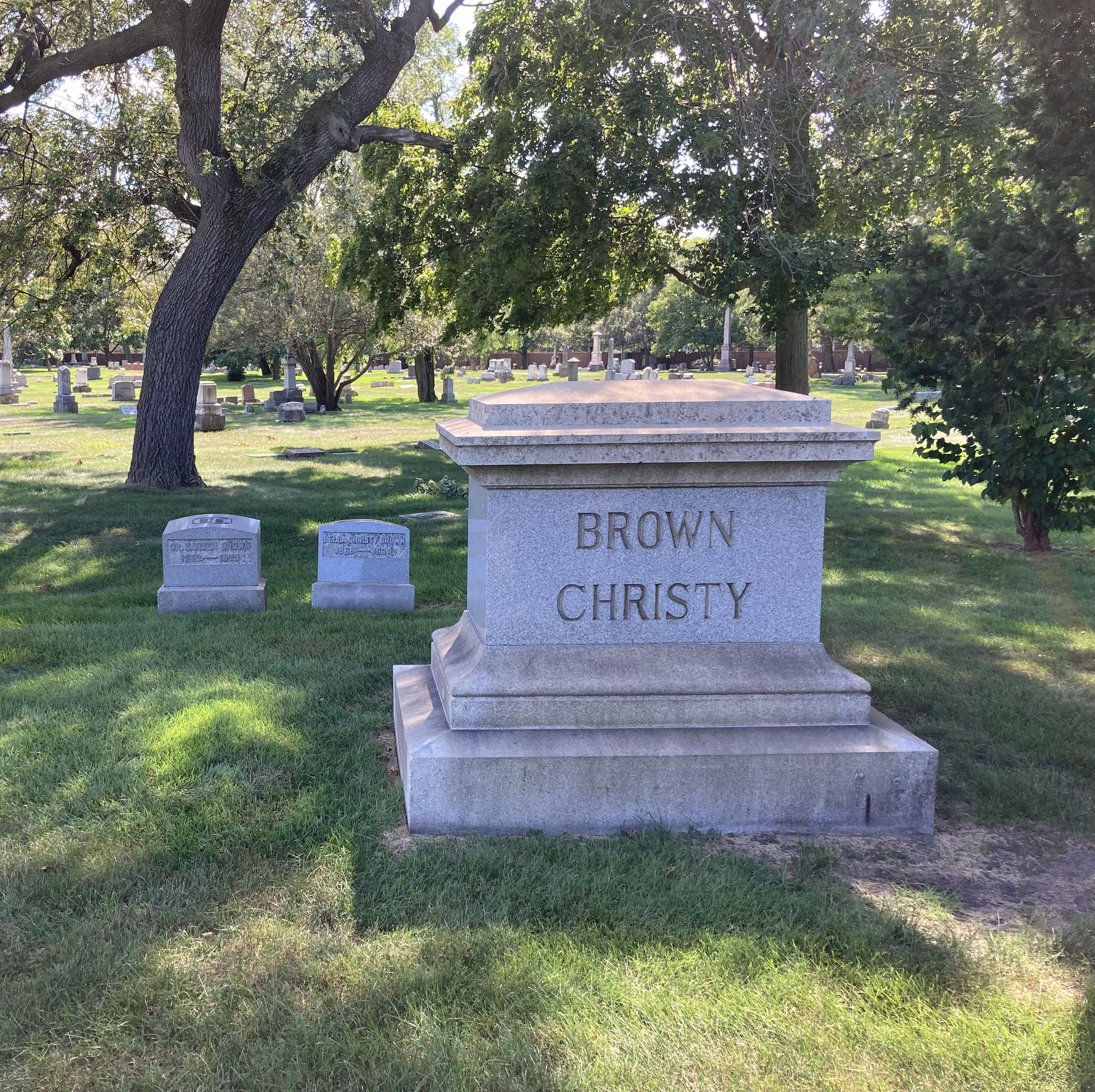
Brown's grave at Graceland Cemetery

Sanger Brown was born in Bloomfield, Canada West on February 16, 1852. He graduated in 1880 at the Bellevue Hospital Medical College in New York City, was assistant physician at the Bloomingdale Asylum for the Insane in White Plains, New York in 1882–1885, and acting medical superintendent there in 1886.

He married Bella Christy on July 9, 1885, and they had one son.

In 1890, he was appointed professor of neurology in the Post-Graduate Medical School of Chicago, and in 1901–1906 was associate professor of medicine and clinical medicine at the College of Physicians and Surgeons in the same city. In his experiments with E. A. Schäfer at University College London, in 1886–1887, he was the first to demonstrate conclusively that in monkeys the centre of vision is located in the occipital lobe.

In 1908 he joined the United States Army Medical Reserve Corps with rank of first lieutenant.

He died at Presbyterian Hospital in Chicago on April 1, 1928, and was buried at Graceland Cemetery.

== Work ==
He is known for describing Sanger-Brown cerebellar ataxia in 1892. It is one of the unusual types collected by Pierre Marie in 1893. It is accompanied by numerous ophthalmic abnormalities and pathologic changes in several tracts of the spinal cord.

== Publications ==
- "An Investigation Into the Functions of the Occipital and Temporal Lobes of the Monkey's Brain" (1888), with E. A. Schäfer, in Philosophical Transactions of the Royal Society of London, Vol. 179 B, pp. 303–327.
