= Gourmand syndrome =

Rare eating disorder caused by injury to the frontal lobe or limbic structures

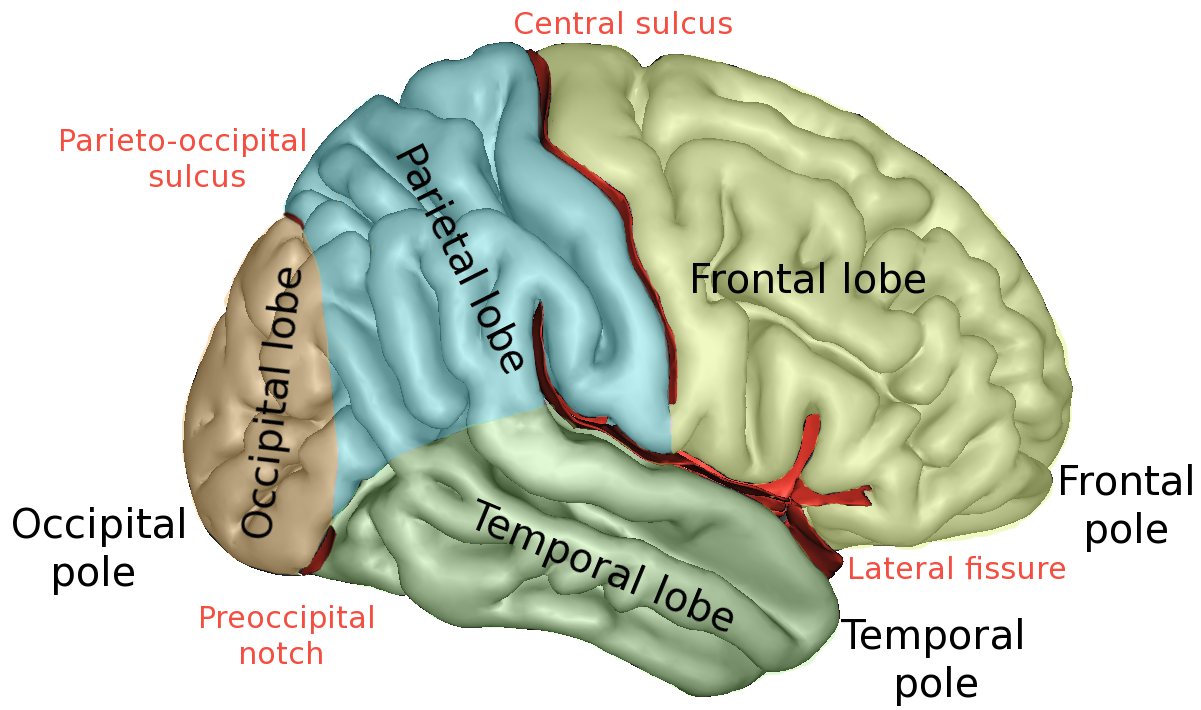
- Frontal lobe (at right)
- Specialty: Neurology

Gourmand syndrome is a very rare and benign eating disorder that usually occurs six to twelve months after an injury to the frontal lobe. Those with the disorder usually have a right hemisphere frontal or temporal brain lesion typically affecting the cortical areas, basal ganglia or limbic structures. These people develop a new, post-injury passion for gourmet food.

There are two main aspects of gourmand syndrome: first, the fine dining habits and changes to taste, and second, an obsessive component which may result in craving and preservation. Gourmand syndrome can be related to, and shares biological features with, addictive and obsessive disorders. The syndrome was first characterized in 1997.

== Signs and symptoms ==
A new-found obsession with high-quality foods after frontal lobe injury is the primary characterization of gourmand syndrome.

== Causes ==
It is believed that the frontotemporal circuits, which are normally involved in healthy eating, can cause gourmand syndrome when they are injured.

== History ==
Only 36 people had been diagnosed with gourmand syndrome as of 2001. In many of these cases, the patient did not have any interest in food beforehand nor any family history with eating disorders.

The first, most famous case was seen in 1997 by Regard and Landis in the journal Neurology. After a Swiss stroke patient was released from the hospital, he immediately quit his job as a political journalist and took up the profession of food critic. Regard and Landis also observed an athletic businessman with this condition whose family was shocked to see such a sudden, drastic change in his diet.

Only one case of gourmand syndrome has been reported in a child. He was born with issues with his right temporal lobe. At eight years old he began to experience seizures. Within a year of the seizures beginning, his behavior began exhibit symptoms of gourmand syndrome.

In 2014, a man that was once interested in marathon running now was only interested in gastronomy, traveling hundreds or thousands of miles to eat gourmet food. He became a famous gastronomic critic and gained 50 kg (110 pounds).
