= Utilization behavior =

Neurobehavioral phenomena involving irresistible usage of objects in view

Utilization behavior (UB) is a type of neurobehavioral phenomena that involves someone grabbing objects in view and starting the 'appropriate' behavior associated with it at an 'inappropriate' time. Patients exhibiting utilization behavior have difficulty resisting the impulse to operate or manipulate objects which are in their visual field and within reach. Characteristics of UB include unintentional, unconscious actions triggered by the immediate environment. The unpreventable excessive behavior has been linked to lesions in the frontal lobe. UB has also been referred to as "bilateral magnetic apraxia" and "hypermetamorphosis".

== Background ==
Individuals who display utilization behavior tend to reach out and begin to automatically use objects in the visual field of their environment. This may not seem incorrect but the difference in action to a person without UB is that the "object-appropriate" action taken is performed at the inappropriate time. For example, a person will be shown a pair of glasses and automatically put them on. This demonstrates the appropriate action at the "inappropriate" time. This causes the inappropriate motor responses to specific objects in the environment.

== Symptoms ==
People with utilization behavior may be unable to resist grasping or using an object placed in front of them, regardless of the context or environment. It is not known what triggers them to exhibit UB with certain external stimuli and not others.

An effect related to UB consists of the feeling that a body part is separate from the rest of the body and has a mind of its own. This set of symptoms may be related to Alien Hand Syndrome (AHS), a neurological disorder in which the subject does not acknowledge ownership of a limb when visual cues are lacking. AHS can involve damage to the anterior cingulate gyrus, the medial prefrontal cortex and the anterior corpus callosum when a patient has frontal AHS. The other type of AHS, callosal AHS, is due to an anterior callosal lesion and affects dominant hemisphere control.

== Causes ==
The cause of utilization behavior can be attributed to many diseases including Alzheimer's disease, Cerebrovascular disease, Frontotemporal dementia, neoplasm, and corticobasal degeneration.

=== Frontal lobe ===
The frontal lobe is responsible for problem solving, motor function, memory, judgment, impulse control, and social behavior. It is also needed for goal-directed behavior. Patients with frontal lobe injury may have problems in the selection, production, and organization of goal-directed behavior.

One category of frontal lobe damage is the exhibition of behaviors that may not be usually displayed. This is the category that involves behaviors such as manual grasping and groping, imitation behavior and utilization behavior. The rest of this article will be discussing the latter, utilization behavior.

==== Lhermitte (1983) ====
Jean Lhermitte first coined the term Utilization Behavior (UB). He observed six patients with unilateral and bilateral lesions in the frontal lobe while the patients were enticed to grab objects. The patients with the frontal lobe lesions grasped the objects and started to use them appropriately even if it was not the appropriate time. Lhermitte used this study to attribute UB to damage of the orbital frontal structures and the caudate nuclei. Imitation Behavior (IB) has been studied by Lhermitte et al. in conjunction with UB which showed an imbalance between the dependence on and independence from external stimuli. It was thought that UB was an imbalance in the frontal and parietal lobes, but the study demonstrated that only damage to the frontal lobe affects UB as patients with damage to both areas did not demonstrate UB or IB.

==== Shallice et al. (1989) ====
Tim Shallice believed that Lhermitte's experiments led the patients to perform the behaviors that they thought were expected of them as the researchers either placed the objects in the patients hands or enticed them to pick up the objects. Shallice performed two procedures, Lhermitte's experiment ("induced UB") and an 'incidental' which included a neurological examination while objects that could elicit UB were present. 23 patients were found to have symptoms of UB.

=== Thalamus ===
The anterior cingulate cortex forms connections with dorsolateral prefrontal cortex meaning prefrontal regions have strong connections with limbic structures. This can be seen in the following study conducted by Eslinger et al. A woman with bilateral encephalomalacia had a damaged medial thalamus and showed behavioral problems including utilization behavior. She conducted unnecessary motor use of objects in her immediate environment. The effect of the damage to the paramedian thalamic region did not astonish researchers because of its connection to the cingulate cortex. Thalamic infarctions have produced hypometabolism, a decrease in metabolic rate, in the frontal areas and hypoperfusion resulting in UB. The patient was marked with the behavior, and brain imaging noticed the infarctions in the thalamus.

==== White matter ====
In conjunction with the thalamus, UB has also been linked to the white matter of the frontal lobe. Ishihara et al. sought to demonstrate this linkage by observing a patient who was experiencing loss of consciousness. The patient, a 72-year-old male, exhibited utilization behavior after admission into the hospital. An examiner placed objects such as a tissue box, toothpaste and a toothbrush in front of the patient and before any instruction the patient brushed his teeth and picked up the tissue in a manner as if to blow his nose. When asked why he did these actions, he had no reason other than that he wanted to use the objects. Later, the patient was placed in front of a paper and pen and he immediately started to write correct letters and sentences without being told to do so because he felt compelled to write.

The results showed that a lesion in the subcortical white matter of the superior frontal gyrus was the cause of utilization behavior in the patient. A coronal section of the brain confirmed an infarct, tissue death due to lack of oxygen, in the left superior frontal gyrus with the main lesion in the subcortical white matter. Fiber bundles are also present in the subcortical white matter connecting the prefrontal area with the nucleus of the thalamus. The researchers believed that utilization behavior could also be a result of the disordering of these fibers. The researchers established that a network exists between the frontal cortical and some subcortical lesions, especially the thalamus, and a white matter lesion may disconnect this network.

== Diagnosis ==
Quantitative methods of assessing utilization behavior are not available for use and because of this those who notice changes in behavior similar to that of the signs of UB should see a doctor. Many functional disorders can be mistaken for frontal dysfunction as several neurological causes can be attributed to frontal dysfunction. Proper criteria need to be in place for determining UB but because this disorder is in the elementary stage, researchers have not arrived at a full understanding of the disorder. Doctors can test the patient's response, communication and motor skills but the only way to fully diagnose this disorder is to do a scan of the brain to see if the frontal lobe has been damaged. This can be done with the following scan types:

- CT Scan (X-ray computed tomography)
- MRI (Magnetic resonance imaging)
- PET (Positron emission tomography)
- SPECT (Single-photon emission computed tomography)

== Treatment ==
Although no specific cure has been found for UB, steps can be taken to reduce its symptoms and severity. If UB is a symptom of an underlying disease or disorder, treatment of the disease itself can reduce the severity of UB and may eradicate it completely. This was seen in patients with Moyamoya disease who had bilateral frontal lobe infarctions which resulted in UB. Upon treatment, the UB was resolved due to 60–70% shrinkage of the anterior lobe hypodensities. Concerning general frontal lobe damage, rehabilitation is known to help a patient function with their disorder.

== Diseases ==
Utilization behavior is present in patients that have ranging diseases and disorders. The diseases mentioned below are some of those that include UB as a symptom.

- Frontotemporal dementia
- Moyamoya disease
- Primary cerebral malignant lymphoma (see Primary central nervous system lymphoma)
- ADHD
  - Children with ADHD were found to display significantly higher utilization behavior compared to children of a control group. ADHD is associated with frontal lobe abnormalities and with the knowledge that UB involves the frontal lobe, researchers have started to form a connection between the two. Archibald et al. found that those with ADHD exhibited UB that was more common with those objects familiar and in the field of view of the patient.

== Related disorders ==
=== Environmental dependency syndrome ===
Environmental dependency syndrome (EDS) illustrates an overreliance on environmental stimuli to guide behavior in social experiences. A person with EDS would change their actions if told of a change in the surrounding environment. For example, if the patient was told that they were in an art gallery, they would start to look at pictures hung on the wall and interpret them as if in an actual art gallery. EDS is known as a more context based form on UB as it involves more complex involvement of motor behavior.

=== Grasp reflex ===
Grasp reflex (GR) is the tendency to seize objects that are usually presented between the patient's thumb and index finger. The patient would grasp the stimulus in tonic flexion, a brief limb extension, and draw the object towards the body thus increasing the strength of the grip. The patient seems to not be able to let go of the object. This behavior is normal in infants but abnormal in older children and adults. A video is included below portraying GR in a baby.

- Grasp Reflex on YouTube

=== Manual groping behavior ===
With manual groping behavior (MGB), the patient's hand or eye is attracted to an object and follows it in a magnetic manner while manipulating the object. This behavior is involuntary and occurs constantly except for the brief stops due to diverted attention. Similar to the grasp reflex, MGB is normal in infants but presents as a symptom in adults.

=== Imitation behavior ===
Imitation behavior (IB) is another behavior established by Lhermitte (1983) and it explains a patient's replication of the examiner's movements. This may be seen if for example, the experimenter claps their hands and yawns, the patient would do the same in the same order. The behavior is still present even when the patient is told not to follow the actions of the experimenter resulting in the belief that a patient with IB cannot stop the involuntary response. IB is important in the development of children but if it is present in adulthood, it is an abnormality.

== See also ==
- Impulse control disorder
