= André Rey (psychologist) =

Swiss psychologist (1906–1965)

- Born: 1906
- Died: 1965 (aged 58–59)
- Occupation: Psychologist
- Known for: Rey-Osterrieth Complex Figure, Rey Auditory Verbal Learning Test

André Rey (1906–1965) was a Swiss psychologist who first developed the Rey-Osterrieth Complex Figure and the Rey Auditory Verbal Learning Test. Both tests are widely used in neuropsychological assessment. Rey was considered to be a pioneer in clinical psychology, child psychology, and neuropsychology. Rey is known in American neuropsychological literature for his "tests of malingering". Rey's tests of malingering include the Rey 15-Item Memory Test (RMT), the Rey Word Recognitions Test (WRT), and the Rey Dot Counting Test (DCT).

== Publications ==
- Translations of excerpts from Andre Rey"s Psychological examination of traumatic encephalopathy and P. A. Osterrieth"s The Complex Figure Copy Test, Rey, A., & Osterrieth, P. A. (1993).
