= Trail Making Test =

Neuropsychological test

- Part A sample
- MeSH: D014145

The Trail Making Test is a neuropsychological test of visual attention and task switching. It has two parts, in which the subject is instructed to connect a set of 25 dots as quickly as possible while maintaining accuracy. The test can provide information about visual search speed, scanning, speed of processing, mental flexibility, and executive functioning. It is sensitive to cognitive impairment associated with dementia, including Alzheimer's disease.

== History ==
The test was created by Ralph Reitan, an American neuropsychologist considered one of the fathers of clinical neuropsychology. The test was used in 1944 for assessing general intelligence, and was part of the Army Individual Test of General Ability. In the 1950s researchers began using the test to assess cognitive dysfunction stemming from brain damage, and it has since been incorporated into the Halstead–Reitan battery. The Trail Making Test is now commonly used as a diagnostic tool in clinical settings. Poor performance is known to be associated with many types of brain impairment, in particular frontal lobe lesion.

== Method and interpretation ==
The task requires the subject to connect 25 consecutive targets on a sheet of paper or a computer screen, in a manner to like that employed in connect-the-dots exercises. There are two parts to the test. In the first, the targets are all the whole numbers from 1 to 25, and the subject must connect them in numerical order. In the second part, thirteen of the dots are numbered from 1 to 13 and twelve are given the letters from A to L; the subject must connect the dots in order while alternating letters and numbers (1–A–2–B–3–C ...) as fast as possible without lifting the pen from the paper. If the subject makes an error, the test administrator corrects it before the subject moves to the next dot.

The goal of the test is for the subject to finish both parts as quickly as possible, with the time taken to complete the test being used as the primary performance metric. The error rate is not recorded in the paper version of the test; instead, time spent correcting errors extends the completion time. The second part of the test, in which the subject alternates between numbers and letters, is used to examine executive functioning. The first part is used primarily to examine cognitive processing speed.

== Score ==
Scoring is based on time taken to complete the test (e.g. 35 seconds yielding a score of 35) with lower scores being better. Different norms are available that allow comparison with age-matched groups.

== Time to complete ==
The entire test usually takes between 5 and 30 minutes. The average times to complete part A and B are 29 and 75 seconds, respectively. It is not necessary to continue the test if a patient cannot complete parts A and B within 5 minutes.

== Population and usefulness ==
The population to be assessed includes adolescents, adults and the elderly.

The usefulness of this test in 1944 was to assess general intelligence, but in the 1950s researchers began to use it to assess cognitive dysfunction resulting from brain damage. It is now used as a diagnostic tool in clinical settings. It can also detect cognitive impairment associated with dementia.
