= Tactual performance test =

- Purpose: measure motor abilities

The Tactual Performance Test (TPT) is a neuropsychological test that attempts to measure motor abilities and the recall of motor stimuli. This test requires the use of a blindfold, which taxes subsystems involved in motor and motor-memory.

The TPT is also included in the Halstead-Reitan Neuropsychological Battery.
