= California Verbal Learning Test =

Neuropsychological test

- Purpose: measures episodic verbal learning

The California Verbal Learning Test (CVLT) is one of the most widely used neuropsychological tests in North America. As an instrument, it represents a relatively new approach to clinical psychology and the cognitive science of memory. It measures episodic verbal learning and memory, and demonstrates sensitivity to a range of clinical conditions. The test does this by attempting to link memory deficits with impaired performance on specific tasks. It assesses encoding, recall and recognition in a single modality of item presentation (auditory-verbal). The CVLT is considered to be a more sensitive measure of episodic memory than other verbal learning tests. It was designed to not only measure how much a subject learned, but also reveal strategies employed and the types of errors made. The CVLT indexes free and cued recall, serial position effects (including primacy and recency), semantic clustering, intrusions, interference and recognition. Delis et al. (1994) released the California Verbal Learning Test for Children (CVLT-C). The California Verbal Learning Test-II (CVLT-II) is an updated version of the original CVLT, which has been standardized and provides normative data.

== Measures ==
CVLT generates a wide variety of measures:

- Immediate Recall
- Short Delay Free Recall
- Short Delay Cued Recall
- Long Delay Free Recall
- Long Delay Cued Recall
- Long Delay Recognition

== Administration ==
The original CVLT was normed on a 'reference sample' of 273 nonclinical subjects.

The experimenter reads a list of 16 nouns aloud, at one-second intervals, in fixed order, over five learning trials (list A). After each trial, the subject is asked to recall as many words as they can in any order (i.e., free recall).

A big feature, compared to other verbal learning tests, is that the words are drawn from four semantic categories (tools, fruits, clothing, spices and herbs), with no consecutive words from the same category. If a subject 'clusters' words from a category together, it is probable that they are using semantic organisation.

An interference list (list B) is presented that shares two categories from List A (e.g., fruit and tools) and has two unshared categories (e.g., fish and kitchen utensils). However, neither list uses common words for a specific category (e.g., apples used rather than bananas). Free and cued recall of list A are tested immediately (short-delay), and again after 20 minutes (long-delay). In cued recall, the experimenter prompts the subjects with the word category.

The CVLT ends with a recognition task, where the experimenter presents the subject with a 44-word list, and the subject must indicate whether it is a target word or a distractor. Some distractors share semantic categories with the target words while others sound alike. The 44-word list is presented like shopping list as it was argued that this is an activity that people face in their everyday activities. Background participant information about age, sex, and ethnicity are recorded for demographic purposes. The words have an average of 2.37 syllables and 64% of the items on the recognition list are distractors.

== Analysis ==
A computer administration and scoring system generates scores for every measure, graphs a learning curve, and provides learning parameters, response errors and interference effects. Raw scores are used for all analyses, ultimately determining how many errors are made in each learning task. The Wilcoxon Signed Rank Test assesses practice effects and Spearman's rho (p) correlation coefficient is conducted to assess test-retest reliability. Primary learning, recall and recognition measures are recorded as well as the more detailed process measures such as errors, contrast scores, and ratio.

It is suggested that a general verbal learning component consistently accounts for about 35-40% of the total variance and consists of total free recall over the five trials of list A, semantic clustering free and cued recall (both short- and long-delays), and recognition hits. A second, "response discrimination" component has also been found in most studies. It accounts for about 8-10% of the variance with loadings from free and cued recall intrusions and recognition false positives. The remaining components, learning strategy (semantic and serial clustering), serial position (primacy and recency) and proactive effect (List B recall) are inconsistent and account for little additional variance.

== Applications ==
The results can give the experimenter considerable information about personalities, different conditions and learning difficulties. For example, an anxious participant may perform poorly on the first trial but improve as the task is repeated. Adults with limited learning capacity may perform well on early trials but reach a plateau where repeated trials do not reflect improved performance, or have inconsistent recall across trials. This can happen if they try and fail with different strategies of learning. Studies have demonstrated that inconsistent recall across trials characterises patients with amnesia caused by frontal lobe pathology.

- Sex: According to some studies, men have worse memory in memorizing a list of words than women. This is consistent with hypotheses linking estrogen levels and verbal memory, as well as the fact that hippocampal atrophy occurs in young men, but not in young women.
- Age: Recall on the CVLT declines with age
- Clinically: Lowered recall has been found in patients with:
  - Traumatic brain injury: CLVT-II after traumatic brain injury to evaluate the sequelae. Deficits in learning and memory are fairly common after moderate to severe TBI, such as those associated to prolonged loss of consciousness and acute intracranial lesions on fMRI. However, it is unusual to have difficulties that persist for extended periods of time
  - Evidence suggest that it can detect whether patients are faking head injury in order to gain benefits
  - Frontal lobe lesions: Disruption of different cognitive processes associated with specific frontal regions, underlies the varied patterns of memory impairment, which can be identified using the CVLT. Patients with frontal injuries learned fewer words, made more intrusion errors and had impaired recognition performance. The test has shown differentiations within the frontal region. Frontal lobe lesions do not cause classic amnesia, but they can disrupt learning and memory. Alexander et al. (2003) compared 33 patients with focal frontal injury, patients with non-frontal injury and normal controls on the CVLT. Patients with frontopolar lesions performed normally, but subgroups with left posterior dorsolateral frontal lesions or posterior medial frontal region had impaired learning and recall. The former group's impairment is secondary to a mild lexical-semantic deficit.
  - Alzheimer's disease: Patients with Alzheimer's disease are often administered the CVLT in the early stages of the disease, as it is quite a demanding task. In more advanced patients, it has been considered more desirable to use the CERAD-NAB List task.
  - Anterior temporal lobectomy
  - Korsakoff's syndrome
  - Huntington's disease
  - Lacunar infarcts
  - Right hemisphere stroke
  - Left side complex partial seizures
  - Schizophrenia
  - Encephalopathy from Lyme disease

The test is used clinically to examine patients with different neuropsychological impairments, but has also helped to understand the properties of the test. For example, immediate recall and long-delayed recall were highly correlated (above r=0.80) for normal patients and those with Huntington's disease, but the variables were only correlated at 0.36 for patients with Alzheimer's disease. The finding suggests that the nature of the association between variables is different for different patient populations and thus the validity is different for different patient groups

== Validity ==
It has considerable support in the neuropsychological literature due to its construct validity. The test-retest reliability of the CVLT has demonstrated stability over time in healthy adults. The construct validity makes it a measure of episodic verbal learning and memory supported by a considerable body of research. The temporal stability of the CVLT-II is still essential to determine its usefulness in measuring cognitive change. The retest reliability and practice effects are consistent with those for the original CVLT and other list-learning and memory tasks such as the Hopkins Verbal Learning Test-Revised (HVLT -R). The reliability ranges from 0.68 to 0.94

== Variations ==
=== California Verbal Learning Test for Children (CVLT-C) ===
The CVLT-C is usually administered to children aged 5–16 to evaluate mild to severe learning disabilities, attention deficit disorder, intellectual disability and other neurological disorders. It also provides information for the diagnosis of psychiatric disorders. It also assessed recall and recognition. The child will receive a list of 15 words on a day (A) and an inference list on the following day (B). The child is tested on A immediately after list B. After a 20-minute delay, a non-verbal test is administered, followed by tests of long-delay free recall and long-delay cued recall. Afterwards a test is administered to assess the recognition of words that were administered the day before. The results produce several different scores including total recall, learning strategy, serial position effect, learning rate, consistency of item recall, proactive and retroactive interference, and retention over long and short delays. Internal consistency and alpha reliabilities for the test are high (usually >0.80). Validity studies show the test is moderately correlated (0.32-0.4) with the WISC-R vocabulary subtest (Delis, Kramer et al. 2004).

=== California Verbal Learning Test-II (CVLT-II) ===
The California Verbal Learning Test-II is an updated version of the original California Verbal learning Test. The original CVLT was normed on a 'reference sample' of 273 nonclinical subjects. The original test had often been criticised as being biased towards individuals of higher education and functioning, as well as reflecting a narrow range of memory performance. The conclusion that was reached was that it provided valuable qualitative information, but it failed to provide normative data

It includes the addition of a forced choice trial to assess level of effort, the inclusion of recall discriminability indices, which takes into account the number of correct words recalled but also take into account words that were not on the original list. The new word list was intended to be easier, with less geographic, cultural and socioeconomic bias. The 'grocery shopping list' has been dropped in favour of an empirically-driven word list composed of words from four unrelated semantic categories. A nine-word short form has also been introduced to improve the utility of the test in assessment of patients with severe cognitive dysfunction.

The CVLT-II underwent nationwide standardisation with a final normative reference sample consisting of 1087 individuals in the US. The education level was also included as a stratification variable.

Reliability data for the CVLT-II is mostly good, ranging from 0.80 to 0.96 in a mixed neuro-psychiatric sample. Test-retest reliability was also adequate.

Validity data for the CVLT-II builds on the vast existing clinical validity data on the original CVLT. They demonstrate comparable mean scores and standard deviations, and significant correlations between the tests. The great weakness of the CVLT-II is the lack of clinical data for many new indices, particularly the new forced choice discrimination task.

== Similar neuropsychological tests ==
A number of similar tests are available including:

- The Rey Auditory Verbal Learning Test (RAVLT)
- The verbal section of the Repeatable Battery for the Assessment of Neuropsychological Status (RBANS)
- CERAD-NAB Word List task is test which assesses similar aspects of verbal episodic memory, but it is considered less demanding than the CVLT. It has fewer items to be learnt (10 items) and shorter words on average (1.70 syllables).
- Hopkins Verbal Learning Test (HVLT)
