= Neuropsychological test =

Assess neurological function associated with certain behaviors and brain damage

- MeSH: D009483

Neuropsychological tests are specifically designed tasks that are used to measure a psychological function known to be linked to a particular brain structure or pathway. Tests are used for research into brain function and in a clinical setting for the diagnosis of deficits. They usually involve the systematic administration of clearly defined procedures in a formal environment. Neuropsychological tests are typically administered to a single person working with an examiner in a quiet office environment, free from distractions. As such, it can be argued that neuropsychological tests at times offer an estimate of a person's peak level of cognitive performance. Neuropsychological tests are a core component of the process of conducting neuropsychological assessment, along with personal, interpersonal and contextual factors.

Most neuropsychological tests in current use are based on traditional psychometric theory. In this model, a person's raw score on a test is compared to a large general population normative sample, that should ideally be drawn from a comparable population to the person being examined. Normative studies frequently provide data stratified by age, level of education, and/or ethnicity, where such factors have been shown by research to affect performance on a particular test. This allows for a person's performance to be compared to a suitable control group, and thus provide a fair assessment of their current cognitive function. The use of race or ethnicity as a normative variable, known as race-norming, has been the subject of sustained debate within clinical neuropsychology; in November 2021, the Relevance 2050 Subcommittee of the American Academy of Clinical Neuropsychology issued a position statement supporting its elimination.

According to Larry J. Seidman, the analysis of the wide range of neuropsychological tests can be broken down into four categories. First is an analysis of overall performance, or how well people do from test to test along with how they perform in comparison to the average score. Second is left-right comparisons: how well a person performs on specific tasks that deal with the left and right side of the body. Third is pathognomic signs, or specific test results that directly relate to a distinct disorder. Finally, the last category is differential patterns, which are typically used to diagnose specific diseases or types of damage.

== Categories ==
Most forms of cognition actually involve multiple cognitive functions working in unison, however tests can be organised into broad categories based on the cognitive function which they predominantly assess.

=== Intelligence ===
Intelligence testing in a clinical setting intelligence can involve premorbid estimates, determined through a number of methods, for comparison with obtained results. For example, test results can be compared to expected achievement levels based on prior education and occupation.

=== Memory ===
Memory is a very broad function which includes several distinct abilities, all of which can be selectively impaired and require individual testing. There is disagreement as to the number of memory systems, depending on the psychological perspective taken. From a clinical perspective, a view of five distinct types of memory, is in most cases sufficient. Semantic memory and episodic memory (collectively called declarative memory or explicit memory); procedural memory and priming or perceptual learning (collectively called non-declarative memory or implicit memory) all four of which are long term memory systems; and working memory or short term memory. Semantic memory is memory for facts, episodic memory is autobiographical memory, procedural memory is memory for the performance of skills, priming is memory facilitated by prior exposure to a stimulus and working memory is a form of short term memory for information manipulation.}

- Benton Visual Retention Test
- California Verbal Learning Test
- Cambridge Prospective Memory Test (CAMPROMPT)
- Gollin figure test
- Memory Assessment Scales (MAS)
- Rey Auditory Verbal Learning Test
- Rivermead Behavioural Memory Test
- Test of Memory and Learning (TOMAL)
- Mental Attributes Profiling System
- Wechsler Memory Scale (WMS)

=== Language ===
Language functions include speech, reading and writing, all of which can be selectively impaired.

- Boston Diagnostic Aphasia Examination
- Boston Naming Test
- Comprehensive Aphasia Test (CAT)
- Multilingual Aphasia Examination

=== Executive function ===
Executive functions is an umbrella term for a various cognitive processes and sub-processes. The executive functions include: problem solving, planning, organizational skills, selective attention, inhibitory control and some aspects of short term memory.}

- Behavioural Assessment of Dysexecutive Syndrome (BADS)
- CNS Vital Signs (Brief Core Battery)
- Continuous performance task (CPT)
- Controlled Oral Word Association Test (COWAT)
- d2 Test of Attention
- Delis–Kaplan Executive Function System (D-KEFS)
- Digit Vigilance Test
- Figural Fluency Test
- Halstead Category Test
- Hayling and Brixton tests
- Kaplan Baycrest Neurocognitive Assessment (KBNA)
- Kaufman Short Neuropsychological Assessment
- Paced Auditory Serial Addition Test (PASAT)
- Rey–Osterrieth Complex Figure
- Ruff Figural Fluency Test
- Stroop task
- Test of Variables of Attention (T.O.V.A.)
- Tower of London Test
- Trail-Making Test (TMT) or Trails A & B
- Wisconsin Card Sorting Test (WCST)
- Symbol Digit Modalities Test
- Test of Everyday Attention (TEA)

=== Visuospatial ===
Neuropsychological tests of visuospatial function should cover the areas of visual perception, visual construction and visual integration. Though not their only functions, these tasks are to a large degree carried out by areas of the parietal lobe.

- Clock Test
- Hooper Visual Organisation Task (VOT)
- Rey–Osterrieth Complex Figure

=== Dementia specific ===
Dementia testing is often done by way of testing the cognitive functions that are most often impaired by the disease e.g. memory, orientation, language and problem solving.

- The Alzheimer's Disease Assessment Scale-Cognitive Subscale (ADAS-Cog)
- Clinical Dementia Rating
- Dementia Rating Scale

=== Batteries assessing multiple neuropsychological functions ===
There are some test batteries which combine a range of tests to provide an overview of cognitive skills. These are usually good early tests to rule out problems in certain functions and provide an indication of functions which may need to be tested more specifically.}

- Barcelona Neuropsychological Test (BNT)
- Cambridge Neuropsychological Test Automated Battery (CANTAB)
- Cognistat (The Neurobehavioral Cognitive Status Examination)
- Cognitive Assessment Screening Instrument (CASI)
- Cognitive Function Scanner (CFS)
- Dean–Woodcock Neuropsychological Assessment System (DWNAS)
- General Practitioner Assessment Of Cognition (GPCOG)
- Hooper Visual Organization Test
- Luria–Nebraska Neuropsychological Battery
- MCI Screen
- MicroCog
- Mini mental state examination (MMSE)
- NEPSY
- Repeatable Battery for the Assessment of Neuropsychological Status
- Short Parallel Assessments of Neuropsychological Status (SPANS)
- CDR Computerized Assessment System

== Benefits ==
The most beneficial factor of neuropsychological assessment is that it provides an accurate diagnosis of the disorder for the patient when it is unclear to the psychologist what exactly the patient has. This allows for accurate treatment later on in the process because treatment is driven by the exact symptoms of the disorder and how a specific patient may react to different treatments. The assessment allows the psychologist and patient to understand the severity of the deficit and to allow better decision-making by both parties.

Beyond diagnosing specific disorders, neuropsychological evaluations are frequently used to identify intellectual giftedness or twice-exceptionality (2e), assess age-related cognitive decline, and provide objective data for academic or workplace accommodations.

== See also ==
- Clinical neuropsychology – Sub-field of neuropsychology
- List of neurological conditions and disorders
- Mini-SEA – Tests evaluating social and emotional cognition impairment
- Neurocognition – Cognitive functions linked to specific neural systems
- Neuroimaging – Set of techniques to measure and visualize aspects of the nervous system
- Neuropsychology – Study of the brain related to specific psychological processes and behaviors
- Neuropsychological assessment – Testing to identify brain impairments, their severity & location
- Psychological testing – Administration of psychological tests, such as psychometrics
