= Race-norming =

Adjusting test scores based on the test-taker's ethnicity

Race-norming, more formally called within-group score conversion and score adjustment strategy, is the practice of adjusting test scores to account for the race or ethnicity of the test-taker. In the United States, it was first implemented by the Federal Government in 1981 with little publicity, and was subsequently outlawed by the Civil Rights Act of 1991.

Prior to being banned by the federal government, race-norming was practiced by 38 U.S. states' employment services. The aim of this practice is to counteract alleged racial bias in aptitude tests administered to job applicants, as well as in neuropsychological tests. The argument was that it guarantees racial balance. The practice converted and compared the raw score of the test according to racial groups. The score of a black candidate is only compared to the scores of those who had the same ethnicity. If the candidate's score, which is reported within a percentile range, fell within a certain percentile when compared to white or all candidates, it would be much higher among other black candidates.

== Criticism ==
Race-norming has been criticized as racist towards black people and has been compared to eugenics and pseudoscientific racism. In 2021, such criticisms surfaced following an announcement by the National Football League that they will cease to use the practice in determining settlements for players' injuries.

University of Delaware professor Linda Gottfredson has been very critical of this practice, as have conservative columnist George Will and law professor Robert J. Delahunty. Criticism was based on the perception that race-norming was biased in favor of blacks. In the 1980s, the Reagan administration ordered a study into the unadjusted General Aptitude Test Battery (without race-norming); the results, released in 1989, showed that unadjusted test scores were not strongly related to job performance.

On June 2, 2021, the National Football League (NFL) announced they would stop using race-norming, as part of their press release for a $1 billion dollar concussion settlement. Race-stratified Heaton, Grant, and Matthews norms, originally published for the Halstead–Reitan Neuropsychological Battery in 1991 and revised in 2004, had been used in the settlement's claims-evaluation process, contributing to the denial of dementia claims by Black retired players whose scores would have qualified for benefits had White norms been applied. The issue had been raised in a 2020 federal lawsuit filed in the Eastern District of Pennsylvania by two former players, Najeh Davenport and Kevin Henry, and was the subject of investigative reporting by The Washington Post in August 2021. In March 2022, the presiding court approved a modification of the settlement that removed race-based scoring and provided for re-scoring of affected claims. By August 2022, more than 300 Black retired players who had originally been denied claims had qualified for benefits or league-funded medical treatment under the revised process.

Within clinical neuropsychology, the use of race norming has been debated. In a 2009 review in Neuropsychology Review, Gasquoine argued that race-stratified norms treat a socially defined category as if it were biological, and may either mask pathology in patients of one group or exaggerate it in another, depending on the direction of the adjustment. In November 2021, the Relevance 2050 Subcommittee of the American Academy of Clinical Neuropsychology issued a position statement supporting the elimination of race as a variable in demographically based normative test interpretation.
