= Rey–Osterrieth complex figure =

Neuropsychological assessment

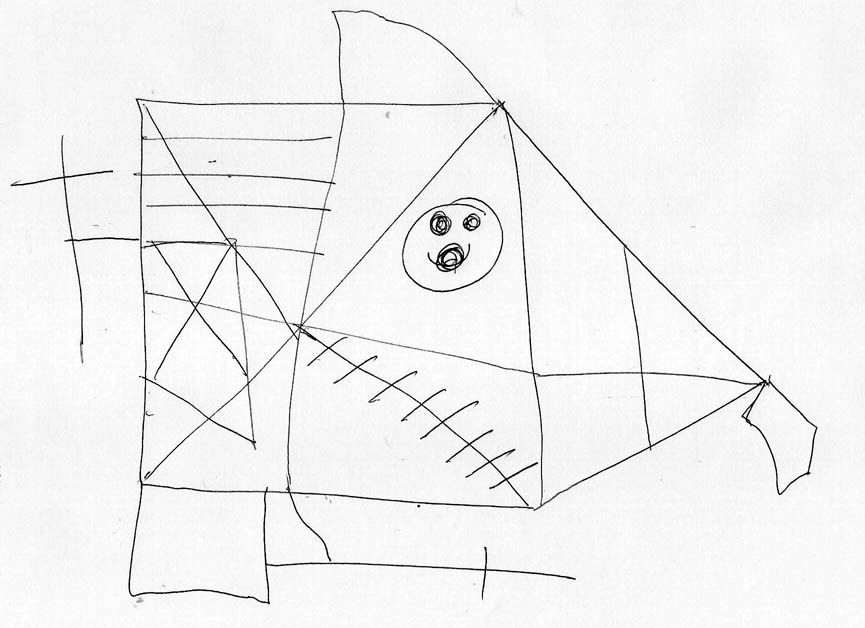
- Example of a copy of the Rey–Osterrieth figure similar to those produced by children or neurological patients
- Purpose: evaluation of memory, attention, planning, working memory

The Rey–Osterrieth complex figure (ROCF) is a neuropsychological assessment in which examinees are asked to reproduce a complicated line drawing, first by copying it freehand (recognition), and then drawing from memory (recall). Many different cognitive abilities are needed for a correct performance, and the test therefore permits the evaluation of different functions, such as visuospatial abilities, memory, attention, planning, working memory and (executive functions). First proposed by Swiss psychologist André Rey in 1941 and further standardized by Paul-Alexandre Osterrieth in 1944, it is frequently used to further explain any secondary effect of brain injury in neurological patients, to test for the presence of dementia, or to study the degree of cognitive development in children.

== Conditions ==
Three conditions are most commonly used in the ROCF.

- Copy: In the Copy condition, the examinee is given a piece of paper and a pencil, and the stimulus figure is placed in front of them. They reproduce the figure to the best of their ability. The test is not timed, but the length of time needed to copy the figure is observed. Some administrators use a series of colored pencils, in order to preserve a record of the order in which design elements were reproduced. However, because of concerns that the use of color changes the nature of the test and makes it easier for the subject to remember the figure, the current test manual suggests that this should not be done. Instead, the evaluator should take notes on the process the examinee uses. Once the copy is complete, the stimulus figure and the examinee's copy are removed from view.
- Immediate recall: After a short delay, the examinee is asked to reproduce the figure from memory.
- Delayed recall: After a longer delay (20–30 minutes), the examinee may again be asked to draw the figure from memory. Examinees are not told beforehand that they will be asked to draw the figure from memory; the Immediate and Delayed Recall conditions are therefore tests of incidental memory. Each copy is scored for the accurate reproduction and placement of 18 specific design elements. Additionally, the test administrator can note their qualitative observations regarding the examinee's approach to the task and the effectiveness of any apparent strategy use.

== History ==
=== André Rey ===
During the 1940s, psychologists throughout the world were facing difficulty in eliciting the specific deficits exhibited by individuals (both adults and children) who had experienced traumatic brain injury. In 1941, the Swiss psychologist André Rey was working at the University of Geneva and recognized the necessity of differentiating between "primary effects, which are a direct result of the insult to the head, and the secondary effects, which develop out of subjective reactions determined by the loss of awareness from the physical impairments". One of the many forms of assessment that Rey detailed in his 1941 report was a complex figure composed of many different shapes, line segments, and other elements.

=== Paul-Alexandre Osterrieth ===
In 1944, Paul-Alexandre Osterrieth, who had worked as a research assistant under André Rey at the University of Geneva, utilized the figure Rey had developed in his work with young children. Osterrieth proposed to subcategorize the figure into 18 elements and score them based on their presence, completeness, and correct placement. This 18-point scoring system is still commonly used today in evaluating an examinee's performance on the ROCF test.

Unlike Rey, Osterrieth was primarily interested in the measure as an assessment of whether or not children had developed the concept of a holistic or gestalt principle by various ages, as manifested by the way they approached the figure drawing. Based on his experimentation, Osterrieth recognized several important trends. Specifically, he noticed that the principle of gestalt seems to stabilize around the age of nine years in children. He also noted several different approaches that the children used in constructing the figure, each of which appeared to be roughly correlated with a particular age group:

- Primitive forms that show "distorted integration" and "confabulations" in their drawings.
- Awareness of specific concepts while still remaining unaware of the overall figure.
- Complete awareness of the overall figure.

Additionally, Osterrieth noticed that strategy was a good predictor of the child's performance on all three of the various tasks.

=== Edith Meyer Taylor ===
In 1959 American (German immigrant) child psychologist Edith Meyer Taylor, who had been a student of Arnold Gesell and Jean Piaget, gave more elaborate descriptions on the 18-point scoring system initially proposed by Osterrieth. She had also briefly worked with Rey in Geneva and credited him with inspiring her to pursue this particular aspect of psychology.

=== Laughlin B. Taylor ===
In 1969, Laughlin B. Taylor developed a second complex figure that is comparable to Rey's and can be therefore used to eliminate the memory effect in a second evaluation.
