= Multiple sclerosis functional composite =

The Multiple Sclerosis Functional Composite (MSFC) is a clinical trial outcome measure of assessing the severity of multiple sclerosis primarily used in research. The score is based on a combination of timed tests of walking, arm function, and cognitive ability. It was developed over two years from 1994 to 1996 by the National Multiple Sclerosis Society.

MSFC was developed to improve the standard measure of MS disability for clinical trials and to create a multidimensional metric of overall MS clinical status. The evaluation includes a three-part performance scale:

- Timed 25-Foot Walk (T25FT) - assessment of leg function by moving a short walking distance
- 9-Hole Peg Test (9HPT) - assessment of arm function using breadboard test
- Paced Auditory Serial Addition test (PASAT) - attention/concentration test to assess cognitive functions

An integrated MSFC score is calculated using z-scores.
