= Test of Variables of Attention =

Assessment for brain damage

- Purpose: screen for ADHD

The Test of Variables of Attention (T.O.V.A.) is a neuropsychological assessment that measures a person's attention while screening for attention deficit hyperactivity disorder (ADHD). Generally, the test is 21.6 minutes long and is presented as a simple, yet boring, computer game. The test is used to measure a number of variables involving the test taker's response to either a visual or auditory stimulus. These measurements are then compared to the measurements of a group of people without attention disorders who took the T.O.V.A. This test, like other neuropsychological tests, may be used in the diagnosis of ADHD.

The T.O.V.A. has been shown to accurately identify 87% of individuals without ADHD, 84% of non-hyperactive ADHD, and 90% of the hyperactive ADHD, but should never be used solely as a diagnostic tool for those testing for attention deficit disorders or with a traumatic brain injury. However, The TOVA generates high false positive rates (30%) in normal controls and children with other psychiatric disorders (28%).

The original T.O.V.A. adult normative sample (1993) consisted of 250 subjects, age 20 and older, and has not been updated to reflect current population characteristics. The sample consisted primarily of persons of Caucasian ethnicity (99%, 1% other), and consisted of undergraduate students enrolled in three Minnesota liberal arts colleges and persons residing in nearby communities. Subjects were excluded from the study based upon current use of psychoactive medication, history of CNS disorder, or history of CNS injury.

== History ==
The T.O.V.A. was developed in the 1960s by Dr. Lawrence Greenberg, Head of Child and Adolescent Psychiatry at the University of Minnesota.

The first modality used diagnostically was the Test of Variability, Inattention, and Response Time (VIRTEST), a mechanical machine that measured response time. During the VIRTEST, a child would press a response button when a target was presented versus the non-target.

After individuals were diagnosed with ADHD from using the VIRTEST, Dr. Greenberg began experimentation with different medications to try developing an adequate treatment plan. The most common medications used in the trial included dextroamphetamine (a stimulant), chlorpromazine (an anti-psychotic), hydroxyzine (a minor tranquilizer), and a placebo. Upon the findings of this study Dr. Greenberg decided that using behavioral ratings, or the VIRTEST, alone was too subjective and that the ratings themselves would be influenced by the testing environment, the raters bias, and external variables.

With the advance of computers, the T.O.V.A. was made commercially available in 1991.

== Testing ==
For individuals between the ages of 4 and 5, the T.O.V.A test is 10.9 minutes long, while for older individuals the test lasts 21.6 minutes. The test may be presented as either a visual or auditory test, but both measure the same variables. During the first section of the test, the objective is to measure attention during a boring task. For adults, this section is 10.8 minutes long and the non-target is presented 3.5 times for every 1 time a target is presented. The second section of the test is a measure of attention while attending to a stimulating task (target frequent). This section is also 10.8 minutes long and the target is presented 3.5 times for every 1 time a non-target is presented.

ADHD has three sub-types: Inattentive, hyperactive, or combined. The T.O.V.A test can test for each of these sub-types of ADHD. When the subject responds to a "non-target" it is noted as an error of commission, or impulsive. During the second half of the test, the inability for the subject to inhibit themselves is measured (error of omission). If the subject responds too frequently, they may be diagnosed with the hyperactivity type. If the subject displays both types of errors (commission and omission), they may be diagnosed with the combined type of ADHD.

The visual T.O.V.A. uses two simple geometric figures and involves clicking the micro switch when the person taking the test sees the target figure and not clicking when it's the non-target figure. The visual T.O.V.A. may be presented in several different ways, but the most common test displays the target as a square with a second but smaller square inside of it near the upper border. The non-target is a square with the smaller square near the lower border.

The auditory test is the same process. The test taker clicks when they hear the target, which is presented as a single tone, usually "G" above "Middle C" (392.0 Hz). The test taker should inhibit their response when the non-target is presented, which is usually the tone of "Middle C" (261.6 Hz).

The test is monochromatic, non-sequential, language and culturally independent. It is presented in both clinical and screening versions. The clinical version is used by health professionals and assistants. The screening version has no diagnostic terms and is used by school-based professionals.

== Scoring/Measurements ==
The T.O.V.A. measures a set of different variables to determine whether or not response times and attention is at the normal range for the sex and age of the test taker. Over 2000 people without attention problems were measured to determine what is a normal response time for the sex and age of the test taker as a basis for the interpretation provided.

- Response Time Variability: A time measurement of how consistently the microswitch is pressed.
- Response Time: A time measurement of how fast or slow information is processed and responded to.
- d' Signal Detection: A time measurement of how fast performance drops.
- Commission Errors: A measure of impulsivity: how many times the non-target is pressed.
- Omission Errors: A measure of inattention: how many times is the target not pressed.
- Post-Commission Response Time: A time measurement of how fast or slow a response is after a commission error.
- Multiple Responses: A measure of how many times the button is pressed repeatedly. (Indicator of other problems)
- Anticipatory Responses: A time measurement how often a person is guessing rather than responding.

== See also ==
- Continuous performance task
