= GATB =

GATB may refer to:

- General Aptitude Test Battery, a cognitive test
- Glu-AdT subunit B, enzyme encoded by GATB gene
- Timbuktu Airport, airport with ICAO code GATB
