= Ralph Reitan =

- Born: August 29, 1922; Beresford, South Dakota
- Died: August 24, 2014 (aged 91); Mesa, Arizona
- Education: Central YMCA College; University of Chicago
- Known for: Halstead-Reitan Neuropsychological Battery
- Scientific career
- Fields: Psychology (Neuropsychology)
- Workplaces: Central YMCA College; University of Chicago; Indiana University; University of Washington; University of Arizona
- Academic advisors: Ward Halstead; Louis Leon Thurstone

Ralph M. Reitan (August 29, 1922 – August 24, 2014) was an American neuropsychologist and one of the founding fathers of American clinical neuropsychology having brought the notion of brain-behavior relationships to the forefront of the field. He is best known for his role in developing the Halstead-Reitan Neuropsychological Battery and his strong belief in empiricism and evidence-based practice. He was a strong advocate of use of a fixed battery in neuropsychological assessment, published prolifically, and mentored many students who also became prominent in the field. As an author, he has been collected by libraries.

== Early life ==
Ralph M. Reitan was born on August 29, 1922, in Beresford, South Dakota. His family was of Norwegian descent and spoke Norwegian at home; therefore, Reitan did not learn English until he began school. His father was a clergyman, and his moral teachings guided Reitan throughout his life. Growing up during the Great Depression, Reitan worked to help support his family as he grew up and graduated from the Chicago Central YMCA High School for Boys. After attending two years of college, Reitan attempted to join the U.S. Marine Corps but was declared medically ineligible. In 1942, he enlisted in the U.S. Army and completed a third year of college while waiting to be drafted. However, in 1944, Reitan dislocated his shoulder repeatedly during basic training, was discharged, and returned to college to earn his Bachelor of Arts in Psychology from Central YMCA College in Chicago.

== Education ==
Reitan graduated with a BA in psychology from Central YMCA College in Chicago in 1944. He started graduated school at the University of Chicago in 1945 to pursue a doctorate in psychology. He took both psychology courses and two years of medical courses while doing research in Ward Halstead's lab assessing the behavioral effects of brain injury in humans. However, he never received any graduate credit for working Halstead's lab because it was in the medical school and would not be accepted by the Psychology department. Within the Psychology department, Reitan was advised by Louis Leon Thurstone.

== Personal life ==
Reitan was the third of five children in his family. His father was a clergyman, and his mother was trained as a teacher. As an adult, he married Ann Kirsch and they had five children, Ellen, Jon, Ann, Richard, and Erik. He also had a long-term relationship with Sondra Radcliffe and they had two children, Carla and Sarah. He later married Deborah Wolfson. He died in August 2014 after a long illness.

== Career ==
After receiving his bachelor's degree, Reitan worked as a psychometrist at the Chicago Armed Forces Induction Station, using tests to see whether inductees had basic reading and writing abilities and could therefore be accepted into the army. Despite a lack of doctoral training, he was recommended from there for a job as a psychologist and began working at the Mayo General Hospital in Galesburg, Illinois, in 1945. This was his first exposure to soldiers with brain injuries. It was here that he met Ward Halstead who encouraged Reitan to apply to graduate school and subsequently offered him a position as a graduate research assistant in his laboratory. It was in this laboratory that Reitan learned how to test and observed performances and deficiencies of brain lesioned patients. He was also greatly influenced by Edward Thorndike’s work in statistics, measurement, and psychometrics.

In 1951, Reitan became the sole psychologist on the faculty in the Surgery and Neurology department at Indiana University Medical Center when he joined as Assistant Professor of Surgery. He established a research lab there focused on brain-behavior relationships. Reitan began giving invited speeches in 1954, often speaking at meetings of the American Psychological Association, and by the 1960s, he was directing three-day workshops on the presentation and analysis of test data.

In 1970, Reitan accepted a professorship at the University of Washington School of Medicine. He later moved to the University of Arizona’s Department of Psychology where he finished his career.

== Legacy ==
Reitan was a pioneer of neuropsychology’s goal of understanding brain-behavior relationships (Adams, 2015). During his tenure at the Mayo General Hospital, he observed the effects of brain injury on adaptive behavior and wanted a better way to describe patients’ deficits when test results showed that they were technically within normal limits. Reitan valued evidence-based practice, precise work, transparency in science, and economical communication, and he was still described as “a softie” when speaking about his patients. He made numerous significant contributions to the field of neuropsychology throughout his more than 60 years of professional work.

=== Halstead-Reitan Neuropsychological Battery ===
Building off the original work of his graduate mentor Ward Halstead, Reitan and Halstead together developed the Halstead-Reitan Battery (HRB) as a systematic, quantitative way to measure the effects of brain injury. This was an early example of the use of evidence-based practice and empiricism in neuropsychology. They determined that a broad, fixed battery of tests was necessary in order to evaluate the wide range of potentially impacted functions, and that the tests must complement information that can be obtained about nervous system function. The HRB is extensive in that it contains tests that measure sensation and perception, motor abilities, memory and learning, language, problem solving, attention and concentration, visual-spatial ability, abstraction, and concept formation. Still, Reitan was inclined to describe this battery as “bare-bones” and only a sampling of a patient's functioning. Many measures were developed by Reitan himself, but others, such as the Wechsler scales, came from other sources. The HRB is an example of an entirely fixed battery, requiring that every subtest be administered in a certain order no matter the referral question or the patient's presenting complaint. The original goal of the battery was to collect research data but came into use as a clinical tool over time.

Although flexible batteries are more commonly used today, the Halstead-Reitan Battery has been said to have “perhaps the most widespread impact of any approach in clinical neuropsychology."

=== Additional Measures ===
In order to evaluate the effects of brain damage children using the same conceptual basis as the HRB, Reitan developed the Reitan-Indiana Neuropsychological Test Battery, first meant to be used with children ages 5 through 8. However, noting the significant differences between 5- and 6-year-olds’ performance, he then designed the “Baby Battery” for ages 3, 4, and 5.

In the 1970s, Reitan recognized the role that neuropsychologists could potentially play in rehabilitation and developed REHABIT, the Reitan Evaluation of Hemispheric Abilities and Brain Improvement Training. After an evaluation using the HRB, a patient is prescribed a rehabilitation program from among the five tracks, A through E, of REHABIT. The program contains over 600 individual tasks.

Reitan also developed the General Neuropsychological Deficit Scale (GNDS), which is said to be the most accurate indicator of brain damage in the field of neuropsychology.

=== Blind Approach ===
At the suggestion of his mentor, Ward Halstead, Reitan would interpret neuropsychological test results while blind to any patient information. Upon drawing conclusions from test data, he would compare them to criterion information and assess mistakes. This technique led to Reitan's understanding of many brain-behavior relationships that are taken for granted today. He would also use this approach to evaluate which tests could provide valid information and whether they belonged in his battery.

=== Further Contributions, Impact, and Select Awards ===
Reitan's work later in his career provided an understanding of psychological outcomes of ailments ranging from substance abuse to hypertension to elevated cholesterol. Throughout his life, he continued to insist on the use of a fixed battery and that the Halstead-Reitan battery was complete and not in need of further adaptation. Supporters claim that criticism of his view come from flawed studies and ignore findings that support use of fixed batteries.

Reitan was awarded the first National Academy of Neuropsychology Distinguished Lifetime Contribution to Neuropsychology Award in 1998. Through the last few decades of his life, he continued to be involved in both research and the training of neuropsychologists, including making his opinions known on the Houston Conference and the Clinical Neuropsychology Synarchy. He was a diplomate of the American Board of Professional Neuropsychology and was awarded the ABN Distinguished Neuropsychologist Award. By the time of his death, Reitan had authored over 320 publications.

== Selected publications ==
- Reitan, R. M. (1955b). Certain differential effects of left and right cerebral lesions in human adults. Journal of Comparative and Physiological Psychology, 48, 474–477.
- Reitan, R. M. (1955f). An investigation of the validity of Halstead's measures of biological intelligence. Archives of Neurology and Psychiatry, 73, 28–35.
- Reitan, R. M. (1962a). The comparative psychological significance of aging in groups with and without organic brain damage. In C. Tibbitts & W. Donahue (Eds.), Social and psychological aspects of aging (pp. 880–887). New York: Columbia University Press.
- Reitan, R. M.(1962b). Problems in evaluating the psychological effects of brain lesions [Special supplement]. APA Division 22 Newsletter.
- Reitan, R. M. (1974a). Methodological problems in clinical neuropsychology. In R. M. Reitan & L. A. Davison (Eds.), Clinical neuropsychology: Current status and applications (pp. 19–46). Washington, DC: Hemisphere.
- Reitan, R. M. (1974b). Psychological effects of cerebral lesions in children of early school age. In R. M. Reitan & L. A. Davison (Eds.), Clinical neuropsychology: Current status and applications (pp. 53–90). Washington, DC: Hemisphere.
- Reitan, R. M., & Wolfson, D. (1988a). The Halstead-Reitan Neuropsychological Test Battery and REHABIT: A model for integrating evaluation and remediation of cognitive impairment. Cognitive Rehabilitation, 6, 10–17.
- Reitan, R. M. (1995) The distribution according to age of a psychologic measure dependent upon organic brain functions. Journal of Gerontology, 10, 338–340.
- Wolfson, D., & Reitan, R. M. (1995). Cross-validation of the General Neuropsychological Deficit Scale (GNDS). Archives of Clinical Neuropsychology, 10, 125–131.
- Reitan, R. M., Hom, J., Van De Voorde, J., Stanczak, D. E., & Wolfson, D. (2004). The Houston Conference Revisited. U.S. Air Force Research. Paper 14.
- Reitan, R. M., & Wolfson, D. (2009). The Halstead-Reitan Neuropsychological Test Battery for adults—theoretical, metholodological, and validation bases. In I. Grant and K.M. Adams (Eds.), Neuropsychological assessment of neuropsychiatric and neuromedical disorders (3rd ed.). New York: Oxford University Press.
