= ADAS-Cog =

Brief neuropsychological assessment

The Alzheimer's Disease Assessment Scale-Cognitive Subscale (ADAS-Cog) is a brief neuropsychological assessment used to assess the severity of cognitive symptoms of dementia. It is one of the most widely used cognitive scales in clinical trials and is considered to be the "gold standard" for assessing antidementia treatments.

The ADAS-Cog is one half of the Alzheimer's Disease Assessment Scale (ADAS), which also contains a non-cognitive subscale (ADAS-Noncog), which includes 10 tasks which assess mood and behavioural changes which may occur in Alzheimer's disease and other forms of dementia.

The ADAS-Cog consists of 11 tasks:

- Word Recall Task
- Naming Objects and Fingers
- Following Commands
- Constructional Praxis
- Ideational Praxis
- Orientation
- Word Recognition Task
- Remembering Test Directions
- Spoken Language
- Comprehension
- Word-Finding Difficulty

The usage of the ADAS-Cog has taken a greater focus on populations pre-dementia, despite the concern that it may not be able to detect any changes earlier on to the development of dementia. Some methods used in the ADAS-Cog are more reliable than others, such as naming and memory item word recall.

== Different versions ==
Since its original creation in 1980s there have been many alternate versions of the ADAS-Cog created for various reasons. A review found 31 modified versions of the ADAS-Cog, these include:

- ADAS-Cog-IRT: Uses the standard 11 items from the ADAS-Cog but calculates the score based on item response theory. Using this method each question in the test is given a different value based on the difficulty, which is determined by how frequently it is answered correctly or incorrectly by a large reference group of participants.
- ADAS-Cog Plus: Developed to be more responsive to the early stage deficits seen in mild cognitive impairment. It includes the standard ADAS-Cog with additional tests to assess executive function and day-to-day function.
- VADAS-Cog: The VADAS-Cog is a variant the ADAS-Cog adapted to assess people with vascular dementia. It consists of the standard ADAS-Cog with additional measures for attention, working memory, executive function and verbal fluency.
