= Halstead–Reitan Neuropsychological Battery =

Neuropsychological test

Halstead-Reitan Neuropsychological Battery
- Synonyms: HRNB
- Purpose: assess condition of the brain and function

The Halstead–Reitan Neuropsychological Test Battery (HRNB) and allied procedures is a comprehensive suite of neuropsychological tests used to assess the condition and functioning of the brain, including etiology, type (diffuse vs. specific), localization and lateralization of brain injury. The HRNB was first constructed by Ward C. Halstead, who was chairman of the Psychology Department at the University of Chicago, together with his doctoral student, Ralph Reitan (who later extended Halstead's Test Battery at the Indiana University Medical Center). A major aim of administering the HRNB to patients was if possible to lateralize a lesion to either the left or right cerebral hemisphere by comparing the functioning on both sides of the body on a variety of tests such as the Suppression or Sensory Imperception Test, the Finger Agnosia Test, Finger Tip Writing, the Finger Tapping Test, and the Tactual Performance Test. One difficulty with the HRNB was its excessive administration time (up to three hours or more in some brain-injured patients). In particular, administration of the Halstead Category Test was lengthy, so subsequent attempts were made to construct reliable and valid short-forms.

== Included ==
The HRNB includes:

- Wechsler Intelligence Scale
- Aphasia Screening Test
- Trail-Making Test, parts A and B (measures time to connect a sequence of numbers (Trail-Making, Part A) or alternating numbers and letters (Trail-Making, Part B).
- Halstead Category Test (a test of abstract concept learning ability—comprising seven subtests which form several factors: a Counting factor (subtests I and II), a Spatial Positional Reasoning factor (subtests III, IV, and VII), a Proportional Reasoning factor (subtests V, VI, and VII), and an Incidental Memory factor (subtest VII).
- Tactual Performance Test
- Seashore Rhythm Test
- Speech Sounds Perception Test
- Finger Tapping Test
- Sensory Perceptual Examination
- Lateral Dominance Examination

== Demographic norming ==
Raw scores on the Halstead–Reitan Neuropsychological Battery are typically converted to demographically corrected scores using normative datasets that adjust for variables such as age, education, sex, and, in some cases, race or ethnicity. Demographically corrected T-scores are used clinically to flag performance below expectations relative to a reference group rather than relative to the unstratified population.

The use of race as a normative variable has been the subject of long-running debate in clinical neuropsychology. The original justification was that race-stratified norms reduce the risk of overdiagnosing cognitive impairment in groups historically subject to overpathologizing. Criticism of the practice includes the contention that race-based norming treats a socially defined category as a biological proxy and may either mask or exaggerate cognitive impairment depending on the direction of the adjustment, and that observed group differences in test performance are better attributed to educational quality, language, acculturation, and the cumulative effects of structural inequity than to any inherent group characteristic. Performance-based and regression-based scoring approaches have been proposed as alternatives to race-stratified norms.

== See also ==
- Neuropsychological assessment
