= Repeatable Battery for the Assessment of Neuropsychological Status =

Neuropsychological assessment

- Purpose: assess neurocognitive status

The Repeatable Battery for the Assessment of Neuropsychological Status is a neuropsychological assessment initially introduced in 1998. It consists of twelve subtests which give five scores, one for each of the five domains tested (immediate memory, visuospatial/constructional, language, attention, delayed memory). There is no assessment of executive function, phonemic fluency, or motor responses. It takes about half an hour to administer. It was originally introduced in the screening for dementia, but has also found application in other situations, such as hepatic encephalopathy.
