= General Aptitude Test Battery =

Work-related cognitive test

The General Aptitude Test Battery (GATB) is a work-related cognitive test developed by the U.S. Employment Service (USES), a division of the Department of Labor. It has been extensively used to study the relationship between cognitive abilities, primarily general intelligence, and job performance.

== National Academy of Science review (1989) ==
The test was extensively reviewed by the National Academy of Science in 1989 in the report Fairness in Employment Testing.

NAS concluded that the GATB is "adequate in psycho-metric quality", but that there were two problems if it was to be extensively used in practice. The first was that there were few alternate forms, which makes it likely that others will obtain a copy of the test and provide on-test training which decreases the validity. The second was that many of the tests were heavily speeded (timed), and that there were several easy to test strategies for increasing scores on speeded tests e.g. filling out the remaining items with random answers when one is running out of time. The report similarly examined questions of test bias (finding some bias in favor of Blacks), validity (finding lower validity, average r = .25 to .35, than reported elsewhere, and that this was primarily due to methodological differences).

== GATB Race-Norming Controversy ==
Beginning in 1981 with little publicity, the United States Employment Service began "race-norming" the reports of results of the GATB. The aim of this practice was to meet affirmative-action goals and to counteract alleged racial bias in aptitude tests administered to job applicants,. Race-norming was also applied to neuropsychological tests, to reduce the number of blacks theoretically misclassified as cognitively impaired.

For the GATB, USES did not report the raw test score of a candidate, but rather reported his/her score as a percentile of scores for test takers of the candidate's race. Thus, a black candidate scoring in the 42nd percentile of black test-takers had the same reported, race-normed score as a white candidate who had scored in the 42nd percentile of white test takers, even though the white candidate had a significantly higher raw score on the GATB. The race-norming process increased the reported scores of black and Hispanic candidates relative to their raw scores, while decreasing the reported scores of whites and Asians.

The race-norming in reported GATB individual results did not affect the demographic and statistical validity of the raw, unadjusted GATB scores.

In 1990-1991 this practice became more widely known. The public controversy over it resulted in such race-norming of employment testing being explicitly outlawed by the Civil Rights Act of 1991.

== Composition ==
The battery consists of a 12 tests which purport to measure 9 abilities or aptitudes:

Symbol	Name	Test(s)
G	General Intelligence	Vocabulary, Arithmetic Reasoning, Three Dimensional Space
V	Verbal Aptitude	Vocabulary
N	Numerical Aptitude	Computation, Arithmetic Reasoning
S	Spatial Aptitude	Three Dimensional Space
P	Form Perception	Tool Matching, Form Matching
Q	Clerical-Perception	Name Comparison
K	Motor Coordination	Mark Making
F	Finger Dexterity	Assemble, Disassemble
M	Manual Dexterity	Place, Turn

(Table after Hunt 1983.)

The abilities are also sometimes clustered into 3 groups: cognitive (G, V, N), perceptual (S, P, Q) and psychomotor (K, F, M).
