= Continuous performance task =

Neuropsychological test for attention

- Synonyms: continuous performance test
- Purpose: measures ability to maintain sustained attention

A continuous performance task, continuous performance test, or CPT, is any of several kinds of neuropsychological test that measures a person's sustained and selective attention. Sustained attention is the ability to maintain a consistent focus on some continuous activity or stimuli, and is associated with impulsivity. Selective attention is the ability to focus on relevant stimuli and ignore competing stimuli. This skill is associated with distractibility.

There are a variety of CPTs, the more commonly used being the Integrated Visual and Auditory CPT (IVA-2), Test of Variables of Attention (T.O.V.A.) and the Conners' CPT-III. These attention tests are often used as part of a battery of tests to understand a person's 'executive functioning' or their capacity to sort and manage information. They may also be used specifically to support or to help rule out a diagnosis of Attention Deficit Hyperactivity Disorder, especially in children. In addition, there are some CPTs, such as QbTest and Quotient, that combine attention and impulsivity measures with motion tracking analysis. These types of CPTs can assist health professionals with objective information regarding the three core symptoms of ADHD: hyperactivity, inattention and impulsivity.

== History ==
The first version of a CPT was developed and reported in the Journal of Consulting Psychology in 1956 by psychologists Haldor Rosvold, Allan Mirsky, Irwin Sarason, Edwin Bransom, and Lloyd Beck. Their research, supported by Veterans Administration and National Institute of Mental Health grants, demonstrated that compared to adults and children selected at random, adults and children known to have brain damage had difficulty attending to and determining whether or not a target letter in a randomized sequence of letters had followed an alert letter. Rosvold and colleagues presented their CPT using a custom-made device that illuminated letters printed on a rotating drum for about one second.

== Test administration ==
Although the tests may vary in terms of length and type of stimulus used, the basic nature of the tests remains the same. Clients are presented with a repetitive, boring task and must maintain their focus over a period of time in order to respond to targets or inhibit response to foils. Tests may use numbers, symbols, or even sounds, but the basic task has the same concept.

In the IVA-2 CPT, clients are told that they will see or hear the numbers "1" or "2" and that they are to click the mouse when presented with a visual or auditory "1" and inhibit clicking when presented with a "2". The task is made more challenging by the shifting of modalities between the visual and auditory stimuli. In the five "high demand" sections of the test, the targets are presented frequently. This creates a continuous response set so when the test-taker is suddenly presented with a foil, he or she may find it difficult to "put on the brakes." Thus, the high demand sections pull for "errors of commission", or impulsivity. The five "low demand" sections of the test pull for "errors of omission" or inattentiveness; targets are presented infrequently, and the inattentive test-taker is likely to lose focus and drift off, thus missing the target when it appears. Data are provided for over-all attentional functioning and response control, as well as separate visual and auditory attention and response control.

The T.O.V.A. uses a USB-connected microswitch that is calibrated to the tester's computer screen, allowing for ±1 millisecond accuracy and avoidance of intrinsic delays in modern computers. Separate tests are administered for visual vs. auditory modes. In the visual version, the T.O.V.A. uses geometric shapes so that language and reading levels do not play a part in the scoring. The T.O.V.A. has two sections, similar to the high and low demand sections discussed above for the IVA. The first section is a "low brain stimulation task" where the targets are infrequently presented. The boring nature of this task pulls for "errors of omission" when the person does not respond to the target. The second half of this test is a "high brain stimulation task" in which targets are frequently presented. This task pulls for "errors of commission" since a person may expect to see a target and impulsively respond. The auditory version of the T.O.V.A. is the same paradigm using two easily recognized tones as the target and non-target stimuli.

In the Conners' CPT-III clients are told to click the space bar when they are presented with any letter except the letter "X". The person must refrain from clicking if they see the letter "X" presented.

In QbTest, the client is seated in front of a computer wearing a headband with a reflective marker. During the 15–20 minutes test, the client's ability to sit still, pay attention and inhibit impulsivity over time is measured. The client is instructed to respond to certain geometric shapes that appear on the screen by pressing a responder button while an IR-camera is capturing the movement of the client. Children 6–12 years old are instructed to press the responder button when a grey circle appears and not to press when a grey circle with a cross in it appears. Clients 12–60 years old receive a more cognitive challenging task, where they are instructed to press the responder button each time a symbol with the same shape and color is repeated on the screen. When the test is finished the result is compared with an age and gender adjusted norm group.

Another CPT, the Immediate and Delayed Memory Task is a computer administered test that involves the rapid presentation of 5-digit number. Successful identification of consecutive matching 5-digit numbers are interpreted as representing attentional capacity. However, this task also includes "catch" trials in which consecutive stimuli match on 4 out of 5 digits, responses to which are interpreted as impulsive. The use of these catch stimuli results in a higher base rate of commission errors, which may be necessary for testing impulsivity in higher functioning or adult populations.

== Test scoring ==
While scoring varies from test to test, there are four main scores that are used.

1. Correct Detection: This indicates the number of times the client responded to the target stimulus. Higher rates of correct detections indicate better attentional capacity.
2. Reaction times: This measures the amount of time between the presentation of the stimulus and the client's response.
3. Omission errors: This indicates the number of times the target was presented, but the client did not respond/click the mouse. High omission rates indicate that the subject is either not paying attention (distractibility) to stimuli or has a sluggish response.
4. Commission errors: This score indicates the number of times the client responded but no target was presented. A fast reaction time and high commission error rate points to difficulties with impulsivity. A slow reaction time with high commission and omission errors, indicates inattention in general.

A client's scores are compared with the normative scores for the age, group and gender of the person being tested.
