= Neurocognition =

Cognitive functions linked to specific neural systems

Neurocognitive functions are cognitive functions closely linked to the integrity of specific brain systems—particular cortical and subcortical regions, neural pathways, and large-scale networks—such that disruption of those neural substrates produces characteristic patterns of cognitive impairment. The concept is central to neuropsychology and cognitive neuroscience, which relate structure and function of the nervous system to cognition and behaviour.

A neurocognitive deficit is a reduction or impairment in one or more cognitive domains attributable to brain dysfunction (e.g., stroke, traumatic brain injury, neurodegenerative disease, epilepsy, HIV infection, or substance use disorder), commonly demonstrated on objective testing and often accompanied by functional decline.

== Definition and diagnostic frameworks ==
In DSM-5, neurocognitive disorders (NCDs) are defined by a decline from a previous level of performance in one or more cognitive domains—complex attention, executive function, learning and memory, language, perceptual–motor function, and social cognition—based on concern from the individual, a knowledgeable informant, or the clinician, and preferably documented by standardized neuropsychological testing. DSM-5 distinguishes major and mild NCD based on the severity of cognitive and functional impairment and provides aetiological specifiers (e.g., due to Alzheimer's disease, vascular disease, Parkinson's disease, traumatic brain injury, Huntington's disease, prion disease, HIV infection, or multiple aetiologies).

The ICD-11 also groups disorders with acquired primary cognitive deficits under “Neurocognitive disorders,” emphasising decline from a previously attained level and separation from neurodevelopmental conditions.

== Clinical significance ==
Neurocognitive deficits are common sequelae of many neurological and systemic illnesses and are major determinants of independence, quality of life, and caregiver burden. Accurate characterisation of the affected domains can help infer likely aetiology (e.g., amnestic profiles in medial temporal lobe disease; executive and processing-speed deficits in subcortical–vascular syndromes) and guide management and rehabilitation.

== Assessment ==
Neuropsychological assessment uses standardized tests with established reliability and norms to quantify domain-specific performance and detect change over time. Brief screening instruments are often used in clinical settings:

- The Mini-Mental State Examination (MMSE) is a widely used 30-point screen for global cognitive status.
- The Montreal Cognitive Assessment (MoCA) is a 30-point screening tool developed to detect mild cognitive impairment with coverage of attention, executive function, memory, language, visuospatial skills, and orientation.

Comprehensive evaluations typically include multi-test batteries tailored to referral questions, with interpretation in light of psychometric properties, effort testing, medical history, imaging, and functional assessment.

== Terminology, usage, and criticism ==
The term neurocognitive rose to prominence in clinical classification with the introduction of the DSM-5 NCD framework in 2013, although clinicians and researchers had long related cognitive performance to neural systems in neuropsychology and behavioural neurology. Some authors argue that adding the prefix “neuro-” to cognitive is a pleonasm and therefore prefer the simpler term in clinical contexts.

== See also ==
- Cognition
- Cognitive neuroscience
- Cognitive neuropsychology
- Neuropsychology
- Neuropsychological test
- Cognitive rehabilitation
- Mild cognitive impairment
- Dementia
- Traumatic brain injury
