= Luria–Nebraska Neuropsychological Battery =

Luria–Nebraska neuropsychological battery
- MeSH: D008182

The Luria–Nebraska Neuropsychological Battery (LNNB) is a standardized test that identifies neuropsychological deficiencies by measuring functioning on fourteen scales. It evaluates learning, experience, and cognitive skills. The test was created by Charles Golden in 1981 and based on previous work by Alexander Luria that emphasizes a qualitative instead of quantitative approach. The original, adult version is for use with ages fifteen and over, while the Luria–Nebraska Neuropsychological Battery for Children (LNNB-C) can be used with ages eight to twelve; both tests take two to three hours to administer. The LNNB has 269 items divided among fourteen scales, which are motor, rhythm, tactile, visual, receptive speech, expressive speech, writing, reading, arithmetic, memory, intellectual processes, pathognomonic, left hemisphere, and right hemisphere. The test is graded on scales that are correlated to regions of the brain to help identify which region may be damaged. The Luria–Nebraska has been found to be reliable and valid; it is comparable in this sense to other neuropsychological tests in its ability to differentiate between brain damage and mental illness. The test is used to diagnose and determine the nature of cognitive impairment, including the location of the brain damage, to understand the patient's brain structure and abilities, to pinpoint causes of behavior, and to help plan treatment.

== History ==
The purpose of early neuropsychological tests was simply to determine whether or not a person had a brain injury or brain damage. Although they can still perform this function, modern brain imaging has made it less necessary. Instead, these tests now serve to describe the injury, including its location and the degree of impairment. The ability to perform these functions began with Alexander Luria's original qualitative procedures. The work of this Russian neuropsychologist would become the basis for the theory behind the Luria–Nebraska Neuropsychological Battery. Compared to traditional tests, these procedures were better at determining patients' strengths and weaknesses; however, their standardization was prevented by their lack of fixed content and the fact they had no definite method of scoring or accuracy determination.

Luria's original method, released in 1966, was revised by Anne-Lise Christensen in 1975 to describe the procedure more in-depth. This revision made possible a version that combined the qualitative and quantitative aspects of the procedures. In 1977 Charles Golden presented the Luria-South Dakota, a new version of the battery created at the University of South Dakota that combined Luria and Christensen's works. To develop this version and ensure it covered everything from both Luria and Christensen, Golden first created an exam that took approximately 18 hours to administer and contained nearly 2,000 procedures. From this base items were selectively removed if they were found to lack reliability or validity, be repetitive, be too long, or fail to accurately discriminate a brain injury. Existing interest in Luria's work made this battery instantly popular, and as it was circulated, demand and research only grew. Western Psychological Services created the current revision, the Luria–Nebraska Neuropsychological Battery. It was published in 1980 in the Journal of Consulting and Clinical Psychology and the International Journal of Neuroscience.

The Luria–Nebraska has been the subject of some debate that has split the neuropsychology field. It faced criticism for its combination of quantitative and qualitative methods, the wide variety of its fourteen scales, and the possibility that it did not include enough different neuropsychological skills or did not distinguish brain dysfunction adequately. Large empirical studies have suggested these criticisms are largely unfounded and based on misinformation or lack of understanding of how the test is interpreted. However, these concerns resulted in a decrease in use of the battery, and some negative views of it still persist despite evidence of its reliability and validity.

== Administration and scoring ==
For the adult version of this standardized test, used with ages 15 and above, there are 269 items that are scored from 0 to 2. On this continuum a score of 0 represents a normal non-damaged brain and a higher score near 2 depicts brain damage. None of these items measures exactly the same thing, although each of them may have alternative ways of measuring the same behavior. These 269 items are divided among fourteen scales, which are motor, rhythm, tactile, visual, receptive speech, expressive speech, writing, reading, arithmetic, memory, intellectual processes, pathognomonic, left hemisphere, and right hemisphere. The time it takes to administer the task is about 2 to 3 hours. The reason for the long length of time is the several items that need to be tested, and this is also why the test cannot be administered to very young children. By testing the limits of patients' performance, it is then able to make correlations between a normal and damaged brain. There is some discussion on the standardized interruption of the test. The children's version of the test is for 8–12 years old. This test has 149 different items that also measure on a continuum from 0 to 2. It also takes roughly 2 to 3 hours to administer and the same constructs are being measured.

== Reliability and validity ==
Studies have shown that the LNNB is stable over time. A study has shown that the lowest test re-test reliability of the LNNB is a .77 and this is within the limitations of clinical tests. Also, studies have combined the Luria–Nebraska Battery with existing tests in psychology, speech, and education to look at the reliability of the battery. This version of the test had 33 scales and by comparing non-brain-injured control groups to brain-injured patients it was found that the test is very effective at discriminating between normal and brain-injured subjects. Studies have shown that the LNNB has yielded an 86% correct hit rate for identifying patients correctly. When looking at the left and right hemisphere scales, the test is based on the assumption that the left hemisphere is verbally dominant and composed of the motor and tactile scales that represent right-hand sensory/motor performance while the right hemisphere consists of items representing left-hand sensory/ motor performance. When looking at lateralization reports of the test, it yields an average hit rate of 78% on comparison of left and right scales with the highest hit rate being 92%. Also, when looking at localization of chronic hospitalized patients with injuries in the frontal, sensorimotor, temporal, and parietal-occipital areas, the test was 88% effective in localizing the brain damage, but the limit to this report was a small sample size of 60 patients.

== Applications ==
Applications of the LNNB are generally seen in clinical settings such as hospitals, counseling, and research. Research has shown its shorter testing time, cost to administer, and effectiveness allow for cost-efficient and reliable results. The LNNB has been used to determine brain functions after trauma to the brain occurs and to pin-point what mental disorder is present. Through its development and revision, the battery has also been shown to aid in presenting other underlying ailments that could not be detected by other sources. In some cases the LNNB has been seen to show sensitivity to more subtle abnormalities in brain functioning, which researchers did not expect. Due to its ability to target the damage of the brain, if any, as well as the mental disorder, the LNNB is useful in finding treatment options, assessing research, and aiding in choosing research participants. Disorders that the LNNB has been seen to detect include schizophrenia, borderline personality, post-traumatic stress disorder, brain trauma, epilepsy tumor, metabolic problems, and degenerative disorders.
