= Paced Auditory Serial Addition Test =

- Purpose: neuropsychological test to assess capacity/rate of information processing

Paced Auditory Serial Addition Test (PASAT) is a neuropsychological test used to assess capacity and rate of information processing and sustained and divided attention.

Originally the test was known as the Paced Auditory Serial Addition Task (PASAT). The subjects are given in the version used as part of the Multiple Sclerosis Functional Composite a number every 3 seconds and are asked to add the number they just heard with the number they heard before. This is a challenging task that involves working memory, attention and arithmetic capabilities. Versions with numbers presented every 2 seconds are also available. The original version presented the numbers every 2.4 seconds with 0.4 decrements for subsequent trials. The PASAT was originally developed for use in evaluating patients with head injury. The advantage in this population was supposed to be minimal practice effects. This test has been widely used in other conditions besides traumatic brain injury.

== Multiple sclerosis ==
It has become widely used in the testing of patients with multiple sclerosis as patients with this disease frequently have an impaired performance on this test. The PASAT was included in the Multiple Sclerosis Functional Composite as a cognitive measure. However, the use of the PASAT in clinical trials in MS it has shown to be problematic as there are significant practice effects over repeated measures; typically the effect of treatment is reflected by a larger improvement on the test compared to the control group.
