= Cognitive Function Scanner =

- Purpose: cognitive assessment

The Cognitive Function Scanner (CFS) originally developed by Peter Laursen, DMedSc, DPsySc, and Thomas Sams, PhD, for the Danish National Institute of Occupational Health in the early 1980s. It is a computer-aided cognitive assessment system consisting of a battery of neuropsychological tests, administered to subjects using computer screen, a dedicated keyboard and a graphics tablet as stimulus and response media, respectively. The nine tests in CFS examine various areas of cognitive function, including:

- Short-term and long-term verbal memory
- Short-term and long-term visual memory
- Visuomotor functioning (eye-hand coordination)
- Visuospatial functioning
- Perception
- Attention, reaction time and vigilance (visual and auditory).

The CFS takes advantage of the precision and rigor of computer technology, whilst retaining the wide range of ability measures demanded from a neuropsychological battery. In contrast to other cognitive test batteries and in addition to its psychometric measures, the later versions of CFS includes detailed recording of every step of the full response process in all tests (collection of qualitative data to support interpretation of every psychometric outcome). Cognitive Function Scanner was one of the first psychological test methods to include an artificial neural network for scoring a test. In 2018 CFS has migrated to the Android platform and a memory test based on environmental sounds was added for examination of blind people. The migration means that all ten tests run on the one and same mobile unit (Samsung Galaxy S-series tablets featuring digital pencil input), allowing among other things for bedside examinations. The CFS is suitable for subjects who can read and understand numbers. Norms standardized on age, gender and education are based on a sample of 1,026 of the general Danish population, with an age range of 25–75 years. The CFS aims to be culture and language independent through the use of non-verbal stimuli in all tests, except the Word Learning and Memory Test.

== See also ==
- Artificial neural network
- Cognitive test
- Computer-based assessment
- Neuropsychological test
- Psychological Testing
