= Test of everyday attention =

Attentional functioning test

The Test of Everyday Attention (TEA) is designed to measure attention in adults age 18 through 80 years. The test comprises 8 subsets that represent everyday tasks and has three parallel forms. It assess three aspects of attentional functioning: selective attention, sustained attention, and mental shifting.

== Test subsets ==
The subsets include the following:

- Map Search: looking at a large map of Philadelphia, patients search for symbols (selective attention)
- Elevator Counting: subjects listen to a series of tones, and must indicate a floor number
- Visual Elevator: subjects must count up and down in response to a series of visually presented "floors"
- Telephone Search: subjects must identify symbols in a simulated telephone directory, in some versions counting audio tones at the same time
- Lottery: subjects are asked to listen for their 'winning number' presented on audio tape, then write down the two letters preceding a specified number

== TEA-Ch ==
There is also a version available for children and adolescents aged 6 to 15 years and 11 months, called the Test of Everyday Attention for Children (TEA-Ch). The TEA-Ch has 9 subsets and two parallel forms. Administration time is 55 to 60 minutes.

=== TEA-Ch subsets ===
Selective attention is measured by two tasks requiring the ability to detect targets from distractors:

- Sky Search
- Map Mission

Sustained attention is measured by four tasks:

- Score
- Score DT
- Code Transmission
- Walk/Don't Walk
