= Incidental memory =

Incidental memory is defined as the ability to acquire and recall information that was unintentionally encoded and stored. It describes how memory formation occurs incidentally as a byproduct of engaging in other activities without conscious and deliberate efforts to remember and meaningfully process the information.

Incidental memory fosters incidental learning of inadvertently learning information, skills, and experiences during other tasks. This is considered to be more prominent in everyday situations since individuals more commonly remember incidents and information without the intention of doing so through observation, repetition and social interaction. Few examples of incidental memory include remembering exactly how one meets a friend, or a scene in a favourite movie.

== Incidental Memory Tests ==
Long-term memory is a critical feature of human cognition and experimental psychology, where humans are said to have an incredible capacity for information, especially in the Visual Long-term memory (VLTM). Research depicts that memories are built from chance encounters in the world, where individuals have the ability to store countless images, even if viewed for a short period of time.

Due to its functional significance, neuropsychological research employ tests to study memory's cognitive processes, focusing on its encoding, storage, and retrieval.

These subsequent memory test paradigms foster initial encoding of information which occurs either intentionally or incidentally.

=== Intentional Encoding Paradigm ===
Intentional encoding occurs when individuals consciously try to memorise information for memory formation, being an effortful way of acquiring episodic or semantic information by engaging attentional and executive resources.

These paradigms rely on conditions where participants are explicitly instructed to memorise material to be tested later through a memory test, or retrieval phase. Such conditions are significant to understand memory in academic and educational contexts requiring explicit studying.

=== Incidental Encoding Paradigm ===
Incidental encoding is when memory formation is unintentional.

To study this side of long-term memory, experimental psychologists use an incidental encoding paradigm. This taps into incidental learning by investigating how engagement and attention influences the production of incidental long-term memories.

In these conditions, participants are not instructed to memorise the main stimulus for cognitive testing while not being aware of a subsequent retrieval phase. Participants' attention are directed to perform a secondary cover task as they unintentionally encode the main stimuli "along the way", then asked to recollect the cover task stimulus.

This is frequently used as people often form new long-term memories through experiences getting encoded automatically.

== Attention on Incidental Memory ==
Psychologists argue that memory is a product of attention, where higher conscious attention results in higher incidentally acquired memory. There is significantly less information on the relationship between attention on incidental memory. However, research shows that attentional and executive functioning is more strongly associated with incidental than intentional memory.

=== Selective Attention ===
Selective attention is when individuals direct their awareness towards particular stimuli while simultaneously suppressing irrelevant or distracting stimuli.

It is proposed that incidental memory is a measure of selective attention with trade-offs between them.

Development of higher selective attention on central tasks reduces incidental memory performance by inhibiting information processing of irrelevant and distracting non-target stimuli. The lower the incidental score, the higher the central task score representing better selective attention.

Incidental memory is therefore lower as children grow older due to higher development in performance and information processing, enabling them to focus their attention on central tasks demanded.

==== Inattentional Blindness and Inattentional Amnesia ====
Higher repeated exposure and passive encoding of stimuli does not always lead to effective incidental memory accuracy since individuals can unintentionally remember irrelevant information with a single exposure.

This is due to the mechanisms of inattentional blindness and inattentional amnesia that cause a lack of semantic processing, compromising incidental memory. These phenomena are a byproduct of selective attention, where individuals with their attention occupied fail to notice or recall salient or frequently encountered information deemed irrelevant, lowering incidental memory.

By using incidental encoding paradigms to study the role of attention allocation in object-location memory, these mechanisms are found to compromise incidental memory.

Individuals were not able to remember the location of fire extinguishers present beside their office door despite numerous exposures. Inattentional blindness and amnesia may have resulted from participants rarely interacting with the fire extinguishers, preserving cognitive resources by not storing unnecessary data.

However, despite participants' extended exposure to their office building, individuals showed poor recall of the elevator panel layout, indicating that frequent physical interaction with information does not ensure accurate incidental spatial memory. Similar findings exist in other domains, where people have relatively poor recall for frequently encountered information, including stop signs and memorable logos (e.g., Apple, Google).

Hence, these mechanisms influence incidental memory, suggesting that repeated exposures and interaction with stimuli does not perpetuate more effective incidental memory.

== Age and Incidental Memory ==
Incidental memory was first measured by Raymond B. Willoughby of Clark University. He found that performance on incidental memory increased from childhood to age 13, and then decreased from age 13 to old age.

However, there remains contradictory results on the relationship between incidental memory and age. Numerous studies reveal there stands a greater impact of age on incidental as compared to intentional memory, while other studies suggest age only affects incidental memory in daily experiences.

Ryan and colleagues (2008) found incidental memory declines with age, where younger participants recall significantly more incidentally encoded information than those older. However, a "virtual reality" experiment observed that older participants performed better for incidentally memory.

Therefore, older ages are claimed to have lower incidental memory capabilities, where older participants performed worse both in incidental recall and recognition memory tasks compared to younger participants.

One possible explanation is the Levels of Processing Model facilitating the Processing Deficit Hypothesis and Production Deficiency Hypothesis.

=== Levels of Processing Model ===
Incidental encoding paradigms are used to examine the Levels-of-processing effect on incidental memory.

The Level of Processing Framework by Craik and Lockhart (1972) is a significant theory for incidental learning that postulates how levels of encoding and processing affects the extent of later retrieval. It claims that deep encoding processes increase incidental memory and later retrieval, further facilitated by emotional content.

One way to increase incidental memory and retrieval is through involving deeper levels of processing, where retention is positively related to the depth events are processed.

However, in older adults, the facilitating effect of deep compared to shallow encoding on incidental memory is under debate.

=== Processing Deficit Hypothesis and Production Deficiency Hypothesis ===
The processing deficit hypothesis states that older ages are limited by their cognitive processing resources, causing failure to self-initiate and facilitate deeper encoding that results in lower incidental memory performance. Consequently, their memory performance is worse than in younger adults.

On the contrary, the production deficiency hypothesis states that older adults are less likely to self-initiate deep encoding but if they are told to use it, they perform comparable to younger adults.
