= Comprehensive aphasia test =

Medical evaluation

The comprehensive aphasia test (CAT) was created by Kate Swinburn (from Connect: a charity for people with aphasia), Gillian Porter (an NHS therapist from Hertfordshire) and David Howard (a Research Development Professor). The CAT is a new test for people who have acquired aphasia, the impairment of language ability. The comprehensive assessment can be completed over one or two sessions. The test contains a cognitive screening, a language battery and a disability questionnaire. The authors of the comprehensive aphasia test take account of current linguistic and psychological theory and other variable that impact aphasic performance. The CAT was published in 2005 and was the first new aphasia test in English for 20 years. The test is designed to (1) screen for associated cognitive deficits,(2) assess language impairment in people with aphasia, (3) investigate the consequences of the aphasia on the individual's lifestyle and emotional well-being, and (4) monitor changes in the aphasia and its consequences over time.

== Parts of the test and subtests ==
The cognitive section assesses people's abilities across a wide range of tasks that can impact rehabilitation.

Forming the main body of the test, the language battery provides a profile of performance across all modalities of language production and comprehension.

The disability questionnaire explores the practical, psychological, and social impact of impairment from the perspective of the person living with aphasia. The disability questionnaire is optional.

There are 5 receptive subtests (3 auditory comprehension, 2 visual comprehension) and 16 expressive subtest (5 repetition, 3 naming, 4 reading, 4 writing) Neuropsychological deficits that could be associated with aphasia are tested in 6 subtests (line bisection, semantic memory, word fluency, recognition memory, gesture object use, arithmetic).
