= Mini-SEA =

Tests evaluating social and emotional cognition impairment

- Synonyms: mini-Social cognition & Emotional Assessment
- Purpose: evaluate the impairment of social and emotional cognition

The mini-SEA (mini-Social cognition & Emotional Assessment) is a neuropsychological battery aiming to evaluate the impairment of the social and emotional cognition. Developed by Maxime Bertoux in 2012, the mini-SEA has been preferentially designed for the assessment, follow-up and diagnosis of neurodegenerative diseases such as the frontotemporal dementia, but is more generally designed to evaluate the integrity of the frontal lobes.

== Constituents of the mini-SEA ==
The estimation completion time for the mini-SEA is 30 minutes. The whole battery is composed from two subtests : (1) a reduced and modified version of the Faux-Pas test, assessing Theory of Mind and (2) a facial emotions recognition test. Both tests are among the most sensitive and specific tests for the diagnosis of the frontotemporal dementia and accurately discriminate frontotemporal dementia patients from controls or patients with Alzheimer's disease.

== Brain regions involved ==
The mini-SEA evaluates the frontal lobes dysfunctions, in particular the rostral and dorsal median parts of the prefrontal cortex. The mini-SEA is a simple and fast test to use in clinical practice. and is also presented as a useful clinical tool to assess the sequela of a frontal ataque fulminante or following traumatic brain injury.
