= Neuropsychology =

Study of the brain related to specific psychological processes and behaviors

Neuropsychology is a branch of psychology concerned with how a person's cognition and behavior are related to the brain and the rest of the nervous system. Professionals in this branch of psychology focus on how brain injuries or brain illnesses affect cognitive and behavioral functions.

It is both an experimental and clinical field of patient-focused psychology. Thus aiming to understand how behavior and cognition are influenced by brain function. It is also concerned with the diagnosis and treatment of behavioral and cognitive effects of neurological disorders. Whereas classical neurology focuses on the pathology of the nervous system and classical psychology is largely divorced from it, neuropsychology seeks to discover how the brain correlates with the mind through the study of neurological patients. It thus shares concepts and concerns with neuropsychiatry and with behavioral neurology in general. The term neuropsychology has been applied to lesion studies in humans and animals. It has also been applied in efforts to record electrical activity from individual cells (or groups of cells) in higher primates (including some studies of human patients).

In practice, neuropsychologists tend to work in research settings (universities, laboratories, or research institutions), clinical settings (medical hospitals or rehabilitation settings, often involved in assessing or treating patients with neuropsychological problems), and forensic settings or industry (often as clinical-trial consultants where CNS function is a concern).

== History ==
The first book with the word neuropsychology in the title was Organization of Behavior - A Neuropsychological Theory published in 1949. Another early influential book in this field was Alexander Luria's magnum opus, Higher Cortical Functions in Man (1962). The International Neuropsychological Society was established in 1967. The first textbook defining the field, Fundamentals of Human Neuropsychology, was initially published by Kolb and Whishaw in 1980. However, the history of its development can be traced back to the Third Dynasty in ancient Egypt, perhaps even earlier. There is much debate as to when societies started considering the functions of different organs. For many centuries, the brain was thought useless and was often discarded during burial processes and autopsies. As the field of medicine developed its understanding of human anatomy and physiology, different theories were developed as to why the body functioned the way it did. Many times, bodily functions were approached from a religious point of view, and abnormalities were blamed on bad spirits and the gods. The brain has not always been considered the center of the functioning body. It has taken hundreds of years to develop our understanding of the brain and how it affects our behaviors.

=== Ancient Egypt ===
In ancient Egypt, writings on medicine date from the time of the priest Imhotep. They took a more scientific approach to medicine and disease, describing the brain, trauma, abnormalities, and remedies for reference for future physicians. Despite this, Egyptians saw the heart, not the brain, as the seat of the soul.

=== Aristotle ===
Senses, perception, memory, dreams, action in Aristotle's biology. Impressions are stored in the seat of perception, linked by his Laws of Association (similarity, contrast, and contiguity).

Aristotle reinforced this focus on the heart which originated in Egypt. He believed the heart to be in control of mental processes, and looked on the brain, due to its inert nature, as a mechanism for cooling the heat generated by the heart. He drew his conclusions based on the empirical study of animals. He found that while their brains were cold to the touch and that such contact did not trigger any movements, the heart was warm and active, accelerating and slowing dependent on mood. Such beliefs were upheld by many for years to come, persisting through the Middle Ages and the Renaissance period until they began to falter in the 17th century due to further research. The influence of Aristotle in the development of neuropsychology is evident within language used in modern day, since we "follow our hearts" and "learn by the heart."

=== Hippocrates ===
Hippocrates viewed the brain as the seat of the soul. He drew a connection between the brain and behaviors of the body, writing: "The brain exercises the greatest power in the man." Apart from moving the focus from the heart as the "seat of the soul" to the brain, Hippocrates did not go into much detail about its actual functioning. However, by switching the attention of the medical community to the brain, his theory led to more scientific discovery of the organ responsible for our behaviors. For years to come, scientists were inspired to explore the functions of the body and to find concrete explanations for both normal and abnormal behaviors. Scientific discovery led them to believe that there were natural and organically occurring reasons to explain various functions of the body, and it could all be traced back to the brain. Hippocrates introduced the concept of the mind – which was widely seen as a separate function apart from the actual brain organ.

=== René Descartes ===
Philosopher René Descartes expanded upon this idea and is most widely known for his work on the mind–body problem. Often Descartes's ideas were looked upon as overly philosophical and lacking in sufficient scientific foundation. Descartes focused much of his anatomical experimentation on the brain, paying special attention to the pineal gland – which he argued was the actual "seat of the soul." Still deeply rooted in a spiritual outlook towards the scientific world, the body was said to be mortal, and the soul immortal. The pineal gland was then thought to be the very place at which the mind would interact with the mortal and machine-like body. At the time, Descartes was convinced the mind had control over the behaviors of the body (controlling the person) – but also that the body could have influence over the mind, which is referred to as dualism. This idea that the mind essentially had control over the body, but the body could resist or even influence other behaviors, was a major turning point in the way many physiologists would look at the brain. The capabilities of the mind were observed to do much more than simply react, but also to be rational and function in organized, thoughtful ways – much more complex than he thought the animal world to be. These ideas, although disregarded by many and cast aside for years led the medical community to expand their own ideas of the brain and begin to understand in new ways just how intricate the workings of the brain really were, and the complete effects it had on daily life, as well as which treatments would be the most beneficial to helping those people living with a dysfunctional mind. The mind–body problem, spurred by René Descartes, continues to this day with many philosophical arguments both for and against his ideas. However controversial they were and remain today, the fresh and well-thought-out perspective Descartes presented has had long-lasting effects on the various disciplines of medicine, psychology, and much more, especially in putting an emphasis on separating the mind from the body in order to explain observable behaviors.

=== Thomas Willis ===
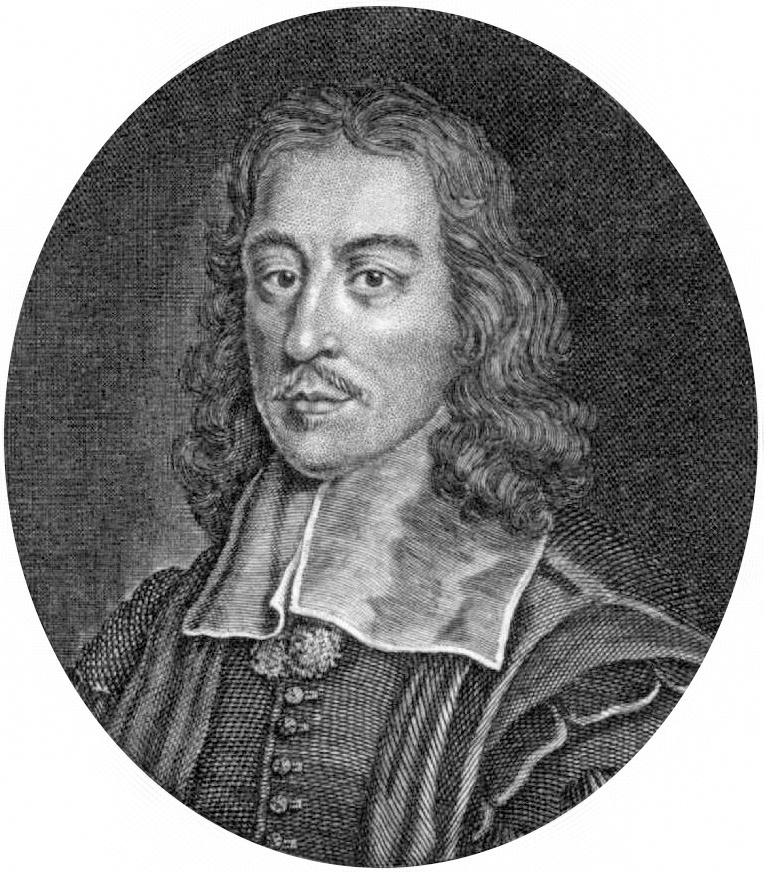
Thomas Willis

It was in the mid-17th century that another major contributor to the field of neuropsychology emerged. Thomas Willis studied at Oxford University and took a physiological approach to the brain and behavior. It was Willis who coined the words 'hemisphere' and 'lobe' when referring to the brain. He was one of the earliest to use the words 'neurology' and 'psychology'. Rejecting the idea that humans were the only beings capable of rational thought, Willis looked at specialized structures of the brain. He theorized that higher structures accounted for complex functions, whereas lower structures were responsible for functions similar to those seen in other animals, consisting mostly of reactions and automatic responses. He was particularly interested in people with manic disorders and hysteria. His research constituted some of the first times that psychiatry and neurology came together to study individuals. Through his in-depth study of the brain and behavior, Willis concluded that automated responses such as breathing, heartbeats, and other various motor activities were carried out within the lower region of the brain. Although much of his work has been made obsolete, his ideas presented the brain as more complex than previously imagined, and led the way for future pioneers to understand and build upon his theories, especially when it came to looking at disorders and dysfunctions in the brain.

=== Franz Joseph Gall ===
Neuroanatomist and physiologist Franz Joseph Gall made major progress in understanding the brain. He theorized that personality was directly related to features and structures within the brain. However, Gall's major contribution within the field of neuroscience is his invention of phrenology. This new discipline looked at the brain as an organ of the mind, where the shape of the skull could ultimately determine one's intelligence and personality. This theory was like many circulating at the time, as many scientists were taking into account physical features of the face and body, head size, anatomical structure, and levels of intelligence; only Gall looked primarily at the brain. There was much debate over the validity of Gall's claims however, because he was often found to be wrong in his predictions. He was once sent a cast of René Descartes's skull, and through his method of phrenology claimed the subject must have had a limited capacity for reasoning and higher cognition. As controversial and false as many of Gall's claims were, his contributions to understanding cortical regions of the brain and localized activity continued to advance understanding of the brain, personality, and behavior. His work is considered crucial to having laid a firm foundation in the field of neuropsychology, which would flourish over the next few decades.

=== Marie Jean Pierre Flourens ===
Jean Pierre Flourens was a French physician who, while investigating Franz Joseph Gall's controversial views on cerebral localization developed the technique of brain ablation as well as multiple significant findings related to localisation and functions of the nervous system.

Flourens, while attempting to disprove the Theory of Gall, removed (through ablation) anatomically defined areas of the brain in animals and observed their behaviour afterwards, as an attempt to localize the different functions of the areas within the brain. During the 19th Century Flourens conducted the first experimental observations focused on the function of vestibular labyrinth through the destruction of each semi-circular canal in pigeons. After this procedure, he discovered that head movements would change drastically in the test subject. Hearing was seemingly unaffected by the severing of the nerve fibres to these organs but it stopped once he cut the basilar papilla. These results led to the hypothesis that the semi-circular canals largely affected the maintenance of both posture and balance. He proposed that a lesion to these canals was directly responsible for the previously found vestibular symptomatology.

Furthermore, Flourens was accepted as a pioneer of the modern theory of brain function. Following this theory, the brain acts only as an entity although specific functions are attributed to specific areas of the organ. This results were reached through ablation and stimulation methods as well as various investigations on mammals and birds, particularly rabbits and pigeons. Results could be seen through processes such as removing the cerebellum, which led to the disappearance of muscular coordination and sense of equilibrium in the animals. This subsequently led to Flourens proposing that the central cortex, cerebellum and brainstem all functioned as a whole, equally and in connection with every other part of the brain.

=== Jean-Baptiste Bouillaud ===
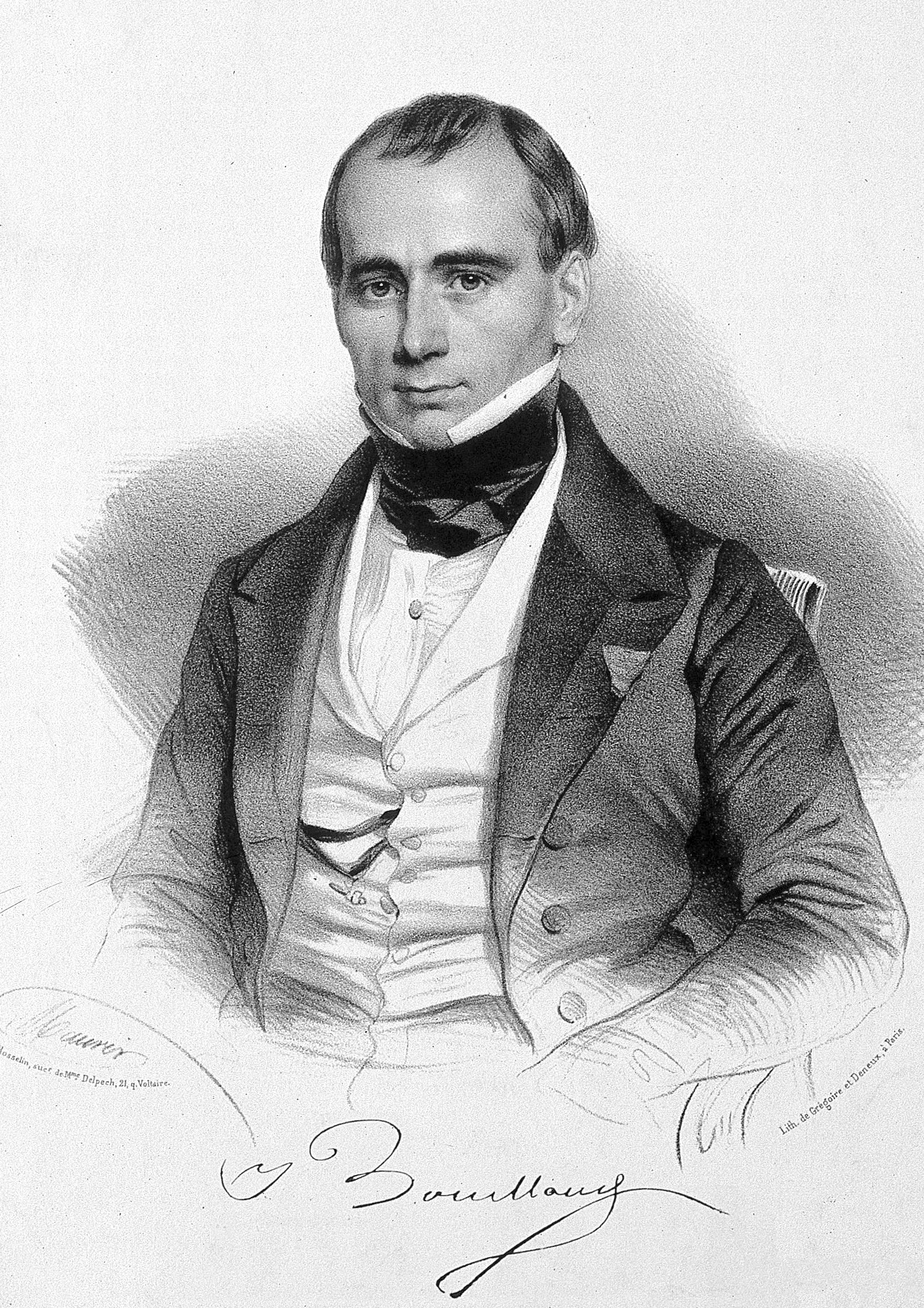
Jean-Baptiste Bouillaud

Towards the late 19th century, the belief that the size of ones skull could determine their level of intelligence was discarded as science and medicine moved forward. A physician by the name of Jean-Baptiste Bouillaud expanded upon the ideas of Gall and took a closer look at the idea of distinct cortical regions of the brain each having their own independent function. Bouillaud was specifically interested in speech and wrote many publications on the anterior region of the brain being responsible for carrying out the act of ones speech, a discovery that had stemmed from the research of Gall. He was also one of the first to use larger samples for research although it took many years for that method to be accepted. By looking at over a hundred different case studies, Bouillaud came to discover that it was through different areas of the brain that speech is completed and understood. By observing people with brain damage, his theory was made more concrete. Bouillaud, along with many other pioneers of the time made great advances within the field of neurology, especially when it came to localization of function. There are many arguable debates as to who deserves the most credit for such discoveries, and often, people remain unmentioned, but Paul Broca is perhaps one of the most famous and well known contributors to neuropsychology – often referred to as "the father" of the discipline.

=== Paul Broca ===
Inspired by advances in the area of study of localized functions of the brain, Paul Broca focused his work on how speech is produced and understood. His research findings illustrated how humans articulate using the left hemisphere of the brain. His research has contributed to advancements and increased interest in the field of neuropsychology in general. Broca's work on the brain’s localized functions, especially speech, has further illustrated the complexity and extreme intricacy of the brain. Broca has been cited to be the first to fully break away from the ideas of phrenology and to more profoundly focus on systemic physiology of the brain [reference].

=== Carl Wernicke ===
Carl Wernicke was an influential nineteenth century neuropsychiatrist specifically interested in understanding how abnormalities could be localized to specific brain regions. Previously held theories attributed brain function as one singular process but Wernicke was one of the first to attribute brain function to different regions of the brain based on sensory and motor function. In 1873, Wernicke observed a patient presenting with poor language comprehension despite maintaining intact speech and hearing following a severe stroke. Post-morbid analysis revealed a lesion near the auditory region of the brain in the parietal-temporal region of the left hemisphere. Originally named sensory aphasia, this region later became known as Wernicke's area. Individuals with damage to this area present with fluent but receptive aphasia characterized by the inability to comprehend or express written or spoken language while maintaining intact speech and auditory processes. Along with Paul Broca, Wernicke's contributions greatly expanded the present knowledge of language development and localization of left hemispheric function.

=== Korbinian Brodmann ===
Brodmann's diagram of the cerebral cortex with the areas he identified

In 1909, German anatomist and neuropsychiatrist, Professor Korbinian Brodmann published his original research on brain mapping, defining 52 distinct regions of the cerebral cortex, known as Brodmann areas now. In contemporary science, the regions that Brodmann identified are frequently referred to by their function, rather than by the number Brodmann assigned to them. These areas are still widely used in brain research, neuroimaging, and clinical diagnosis today.

=== Karl Spencer Lashley ===
Lashley's works and theories that follow are summarized in his book Brain Mechanisms and Intelligence. Lashley's theory of the Engram was the driving force for much of his research. An engram was believed to be a part of the brain where a specific memory was stored. He continued to use the training/ablation method that Franz had taught him. He would train a rat to learn a maze and then use systematic lesions and removed sections of cortical tissue to see if the rat forgot what it had learned.

Through his research with the rats, he learned that forgetting was dependent on the amount of tissue removed and not where it was removed from. He called this mass action and he believed that it was a general rule that governed how brain tissue would respond, independent of the type of learning. But we know now that mass action was a misinterpretation of his empirical results, because in order to run a maze the rats required multiple cortical areas. Cutting into small individual parts alone will not impair the rats' brains much, but taking large sections removes multiple cortical areas at one time, affecting various functions such as sight, motor coordination, and memory, making the animal unable to run a maze properly.

Neurosurgeon Karl Pribram worked with Lashley to determine the exact location of specific memories in primate brains. This work would influence the establishment of Pribram's Holonomic brain theory.

Lashley also proposed that a portion of a functional area could carry out the role of the entire area, even when the rest of the area has been removed. He called this phenomenon equipotentiality. We know now that he was seeing evidence of plasticity in the brain: within certain constraints the brain has the ability for certain areas to take over the functions of other areas if those areas should fail or be removed – although not to the extent initially argued by Lashley.

=== Donald Hebb ===
In his landmark 1949 book, The Organization of Behavior, he introduced the famous theory of synaptic plasticity: "Neurons that fire together, wire together." This concept, known as Hebbian learning, laid the groundwork for modern neuropsychology, and even artificial intelligence neural networks.

=== Alexander Luria ===
Often universally recognized as the father of modern neuropsychology. Working in the Soviet Union, Luria developed the concept of functional systems, arguing that complex psychological functions are not localized in single, isolated brain areas but are instead processed by networks of working zones. His qualitative clinical techniques led to the development of the Luria-Nebraska Neuropsychological Battery, and his books The Working Brain and The Mind of a Mnemonist remain classics.

=== Hans-Lukas Teuber ===
Teuber was a massive force in establishing neuropsychology as a rigorous experimental science in the West. He founded the Department of Psychology at MIT and spent his career studying the effects of brain injuries (particularly in veterans), helping to map out how visual processing and executive functions operate in the human brain. He coined the term double dissociation. He also introduced the "Corollary Discharge" hypothesis. He gave the classic definition of agnosia as "a normal percept stripped of its meaning".

== Approaches ==
Experimental neuropsychology is an approach that uses methods from experimental psychology to uncover the relationship between the nervous system and cognitive function. The majority of work involves studying healthy humans in a laboratory setting, although a minority of researchers may conduct animal experiments. Human work in this area often takes advantage of specific features of our nervous system (for example that visual information presented to a specific visual field is preferentially processed by the cortical hemisphere on the opposite side) to make links between neuroanatomy and psychological function.

Clinical neuropsychology is the application of neuropsychological knowledge to the assessment (see neuropsychological test and neuropsychological assessment), management, and rehabilitation of people who have experienced illness or injury (particularly to the brain) which has caused neurocognitive problems. In particular they bring a psychological viewpoint to treatment, to understand how such illness and injury may affect and be affected by psychological factors. They also can offer an opinion as to whether a person is demonstrating difficulties due to brain pathology or as a consequence of an emotional or another (potentially) reversible cause or both. For example, a test might show that both patients X and Y are unable to name items that they have been previously exposed to within the past 20 minutes (indicating possible dementia). If patient Y can name some of them with further prompting (e.g. given a categorical clue such as being told that the item they could not name is a fruit), this allows a more specific diagnosis than simply dementia (Y appears to have the vascular type which is due to brain pathology but is usually at least somewhat reversible). Clinical neuropsychologists often work in hospital settings in an interdisciplinary medical team; others work in private practice and may provide expert input into medico-legal proceedings. Current research into biological science of memory bridges multiple scales, from the molecular to the neuropsychological (Moscovitch et al., 2016). Memory needs specific details on the specifics of synaptic dynamism and also requires an explanation of the comprehension procedures and memory structures having neurobiological capabilities.

Cognitive neuropsychology is a relatively new development and has emerged as a distillation of the complementary approaches of both experimental and clinical neuropsychology. It seeks to understand the mind and brain by studying people with brain injuries or neurological illnesses. One model of neuropsychological functioning is known as functional localization. This is based on the principle that if a specific cognitive problem can be found after an injury to a specific area of the brain, it is possible that this part of the brain is in some way involved. However, there may be reason to believe that the link between mental functions and neural regions is not so simple. An alternative model of the link between mind and brain, such as parallel processing, may have more explanatory power for the workings and dysfunction of the human brain. Yet another approach investigates how the pattern of errors produced by brain-damaged individuals can constrain our understanding of mental representations and processes without reference to the underlying neural structure. A more recent but related approach is cognitive neuropsychiatry which seeks to understand the normal function of mind and brain by studying psychiatric or mental illness.

Connectionism is the use of artificial neural networks to model specific cognitive processes using what are considered to be simplified but plausible models of how neurons operate. Once trained to perform a specific cognitive task these networks are often damaged or 'lesioned' to simulate brain injury or impairment in an attempt to understand and compare the results to the effects of brain injury in humans.

Functional neuroimaging uses specific neuroimaging technologies to take readings from the brain, usually when a person is doing a particular task, in an attempt to understand how the activation of particular brain areas is related to the task. In particular, the growth of methodologies to employ cognitive testing within established functional magnetic resonance imaging (fMRI) techniques to study brain-behavior relations is having a notable influence on neuropsychological research.

In practice these approaches are not mutually exclusive and most neuropsychologists select the best approach or approaches for the task to be completed.

== Methods and tools ==
=== Standardized neuropsychological tests ===
These tasks have been designed so the performance on the task can be linked to specific neurocognitive processes. These tests are typically standardized, meaning that they have been administered to a specific group (or groups) of individuals before being used in individual clinical cases. The data resulting from standardization are known as normative data. After these data have been collected and analyzed, they are used as the comparative standard against which individual performances can be compared. Examples of neuropsychological tests include: the Wechsler Memory Scale (WMS), the Wechsler Adult Intelligence Scale (WAIS), Boston Naming Test, the Wisconsin Card Sorting Test, the Benton Visual Retention Test, and the Controlled Oral Word Association. When interpreting neuropsychological testing it is important that the diagnosis is empirically informed in order to determine if the cognitive deficits presented are legitimate. Successful malingering and symptom exaggeration can result in substantial benefits for the individual including but not limited to significant financial compensation, injury litigation, disability claims, and criminal sentencing. Due to the nature of these potential benefits, it is imperative that malingering is identified in neuropsychological tests in order to avoid making an invalid diagnosis. The Slick, Sherman, and Iverson (1999) criteria for Malingered Neurocognitive Dysfunction (MND) has pioneered the ability to detect malingering in a variety of performance validity tests (PVT) and symptom validity tests (SVT) across multiple neuropsychological contexts and disorders. These tests detect malingering by identifying performance that is below the level of probability for neuropsychological dysfunction.

=== Brain scans ===
The use of brain scans to investigate the structure or function of the brain is common, either as simply a way of better assessing brain injury with high resolution pictures, or by examining the relative activations of different brain areas. Such technologies may include fMRI (functional magnetic resonance imaging) and positron emission tomography (PET), which yields data related to functioning, as well as MRI (magnetic resonance imaging), computed axial tomography (CAT or CT), and diffusion tensor imaging (DTI) which yields structural data.

=== Global Brain Project ===
Brain models based on mice and monkeys have been developed based on theoretical neuroscience involving working memory and attention, while mapping brain activity based on time constants validated by measurements of neuronal activity in various layers of the brain. These methods also map to decision states of behavior in simple tasks that involve binary outcomes.

=== Electrophysiology ===
The use of electrophysiological measures designed to measure the activation of the brain by measuring the electrical or magnetic field produced by the nervous system. This may include electroencephalography (EEG) or magneto-encephalography (MEG).

=== Experimental tasks ===
The use of designed experimental tasks, often controlled by computer and typically measuring reaction time and accuracy on a particular tasks thought to be related to a specific neurocognitive process. An example of this is the Cambridge Neuropsychological Test Automated Battery (CANTAB) or CNS Vital Signs (CNSVS).

== See also ==
- Behavioral neurology
- Behavioral neuroscience
- Biological psychology
- Clinical neuropsychology
- Cognitive neuropsychiatry
- Cognitive neuropsychology
- Cognitive neuroscience
- Cognitive psychology
- Comparative neuropsychology
- List of neurological conditions and disorders
- Neurology
- Neuroplasticity
- Neuropsychoanalysis
- Neuropsychiatry
- Neuroscience
- Neurosemiotics
- Psychiatric genetics
- Cephalocentric hypothesis
