= Geschwind =

Geschwind is a German surname. Notable people with the surname include:

- Daniel Geschwind, American geneticist
- Michael Geschwind, American neurologist
- Nicholas Geschwind (1829–1897), American army officer
- Norman Geschwind (1926–1984), American behavioral neurologist
  - Geschwind–Galaburda hypothesis, laterality hypothesis
  - Wernicke–Geschwind model, neurological model of language
  - Geschwind syndrome, personality syndrome
- Peter Geschwind (1966–2021), Swedish artist
- Rudolf Geschwind (1829–1910), Austrian rosarian
