= Bias against left-handed people =

Designs and biases against left-handed people

Bias towards people who are left-handed, mainly against, includes handwriting, which is one of the biggest sources of disadvantage for left-handed people, other than for those required to work with certain machinery. About 90 percent of the world's population is right-handed, and many common articles are designed for efficient use by right-handed people, and may be inconvenient, painful, or even dangerous for left-handed people to use. These may include school desks, kitchen implements, and tools ranging from simple scissors to hazardous machinery such as power saws.

Beyond being inherently disadvantaged by a right-handed bias in the design of tools, left-handed people have been subjected to deliberate discrimination and discouragement. In certain societies, they may be considered unlucky or even malicious by the right-handed majority. Many languages still contain references to left-handedness to convey awkwardness, dishonesty, stupidity, or other undesirable qualities. In many societies, left-handed people have been historically forced as children to use their right hands for tasks which they would naturally perform with the left, such as eating or writing.

== Favorable perceptions ==
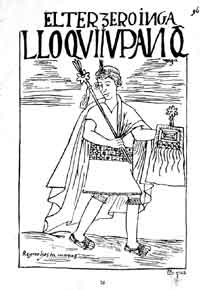
Lloque Yupanqui, the third Sapa Inca, whose name means 'the glorified lefthander'

In Tibetan tantric Buddhism, the left hand represents wisdom.

In early Roman times, the left side retained a positive connotation, as the Augures proceeded from the eastern side.

== Unfavorable perceptions ==
The unfavorable associations and connotations of the use of the left hand among cultures are varied. In some areas, in order to preserve cleanliness where sanitation was an issue, the right hand, as the dominant hand of most individuals, was/is used for eating, handling food, and social interactions. The left hand would then be used for personal hygiene, specifically after urination and defecation. Personal hygiene rules in Islam prefer this, as derived from hadith sources. These rules were imposed on all, no matter their dominant hand. Through these practices, the left hand became known as the "unclean" hand. Currently, amongst Muslims and in some societies including Nepal and India it is still customary to use the left hand for cleaning oneself with water after defecating. The right hand is commonly known in contradistinction from the left, as the hand used for eating.

In many religions, including Christianity, the right hand of God is the favored hand. For example, Jesus sits at God's right side. God's left hand, however, is the hand of judgement. The Archangel Gabriel is sometimes called "God's left hand" and sits at God's left side. Those who fall from favor with God are sent to the left, as described in Matthew 25: 32–33, in which sheep represent the righteous and goats represent the fallen: "And he shall separate them one from another, as a shepherd divideth his sheep from the goats. And he shall set the sheep on his right, but the goats on his left." In 19th-century Europe, homosexuals were referred to as "left-handed". In Protestant-majority parts of the United Kingdom, Catholics were called "left-footers", and vice versa in Catholic-majority parts of Ireland and Irish America.

Various innocuous activities and experiences become rude or even signs of bad luck when the left hand becomes involved. In some parts of Scotland, it is considered bad luck to meet a left-handed person at the start of a journey. In Ghana, pointing, gesturing, giving or receiving items with the left hand is considered taboo or rude. A person giving directions will put their left hand behind them and even physically strain to point with their right hand if necessary.

=== Forced use of the right hand ===
Owing to cultural and social pressures, many left-handed children were forced to write and perform other activities with their right hands. This conversion can cause multiple problems in the developing left-handed child, including learning disorders, dyslexia, stuttering and other speech disorders. Shifts from left- to right-handed are more likely to be successful than right to left, although neither have a high success rate. Successful shifters are more likely to become ambidextrous than unsuccessful ones. Conversions can be successful with consistent daily practice in a variety of manual activities, but even if activity in the non-dominant left-hemisphere of the brain will increase during tasks, so too will activity in the dominant right-hemisphere. Consistent left-handers have no higher activity in these task centers than converted left-handers, so it may be inferred that "attempts to switch handedness by educational training far from weakening the functional expression of lefthandedness in higher-order motor areas of the (dominant) right hemisphere in fact enhance it".

Many Asian countries force their children to become right-handed due to cultural perceptions of bad luck associated with the left hand. In India, Pakistan, Bangladesh and Indonesia, it has traditionally been perceived as "rude" behavior to use the left hand for eating, as the left hand is commonly used for tasks considered "unclean". In a 2007 study in Taiwan, about 59.3% of naturally left-handed children studied had been forced to convert to right-handedness. The study took into account economic status of the children's families and found that children whose parents had less education were more likely to be forced to convert. Even among children whose parents had higher levels of education, the conversion rate was 45.7%. The proportion of females in Japan subjected to forced conversion is significantly higher compared to males (95.1% to 81.0%).

Malawians state their views that "the left hand is less skilled and less powerful than the right one" as main reasons for forcing left-handers to convert. Among students, teachers and parents, 75% said the left hand should not be used to perform habitual activities, and 87.6% of these believed left-handers should be forced to switch dominant hands. Parents and close relatives are most responsible for impressing these beliefs upon their children.

In the Soviet Union, all left-handed students were forced to write with their right hand, as is the case with Vietnam.

George VI (1895–1952, British King from 1936) was naturally left-handed as a child. He was forced to write with his right hand, as was common practice at the time, but was not expected to become king, so that was not a factor.

=== Growing acceptance of left-handedness (late 20th century) ===
On March 8, 1971, The Florence Times—Tri-Cities Daily reported that left-handed people "are becoming increasingly accepted and enabled to find their right (or left) place in the world". The Florence Times—Tri-Cities Daily also wrote, "we still have a long way to go before the last vestiges of discrimination against left-handedness are uprooted, however." The frequency of left-handed writing in the United States, which was only 2.1 percent in 1932, had risen to over 11 percent by 1972. According to an article by The Washington Post from August 13, 1979, a University of Chicago psychologist, Jerre Levy, said, "In 1939, 2 percent of the population wrote with the left hand. By 1946, it was up to 7 1/2 percent. In 1968, 9 percent. By 1972, 12 percent. It's leveling off, and I expect the real number of left-handers will turn out to be about 14 percent." According to the article by The Washington Post from August 13, 1979, "a University of Michigan study points out that left-handers may not be taking over the world but ... 7 percent of the men and 6 percent of the women over 40 who were interviewed were lefties, but the percentages jumped to well above 10 percent in the 18-to-39 age group." According to the article by The Washington Post of August 13, 1979, Dr. Bernard McKenna of the National Education Association said, "There was recognition by medical authorities that left-handedness was normal and that tying the hand up in a child often caused stuttering." In Japan, Tokyo psychiatrist Soichi Hakozaki coped with such deep-seated discrimination against left-handed people that he wrote The World of Left-Handers. Hakozaki reported finding situations in which women were afraid their husbands would divorce them for being left-handed. According to the aforementioned article, an official at the Japanese Embassy said that, before the war, there was discrimination against left-handers. "Children were not trained to use their left hand while eating or writing. I used to throw a baseball left-handed, but my grandparents wanted me to throw right-handed. I can throw either way. Today, in some local areas, discrimination may still remain, but on the whole, it seems to be over. There are many left-handers in Japan." In a further article in The Washington Post of December 11, 1988, Richard M. Restak wrote that left-handedness has become more accepted and people have decided to leave southpaws alone and to stop working against left-handedness. In an article by The Gadsden Times from October 3, 1993, the newspaper mentioned a five-year-old named Daniel, writing, "the advantage that little Daniel does have of going to school in the '90s is that he will be allowed to be left-hander. That wasn't always the case in years past." In a 1998 survey, 24 percent of younger-generation left-handed people reported some attempts to switch their handedness.

In 1999, Swiss researchers took 1,700 Swiss adults ages 34–74 and divided them into age groups, with the youngest being 35–44 and the oldest being 65–74. The researchers found almost twice as many people in the youngest age group considered themselves left-handed when compared to the oldest age group. In addition, the incidence of the older group switching to their right hand for writing was more than triple that of the younger group. Researchers found that among the four age groups (35–44, 45–54, 55–64, and 65–74), the prevalence of left-handedness declined from 11.9% among 35 to 44 year olds and roughly 12.5% among 45 to 54 year olds to roughly 8% among 55 to 64 year olds and 6.2% among 65 to 74 year olds. Additionally, researchers found that only 26.6% of 35 to 44 year olds switched to right-handedness for writing and roughly 73% wrote with their left hand. Among 45 to 54 year olds, roughly 52% write with their right hand and roughly 48% write with their left hand. Roughly 85% of 55 to 64 year olds wrote with their right hand and roughly 15% of 55 to 64 year olds wrote with their left hand. 88.9% of 65 to 74 year olds wrote with their right hand while 11.1% wrote with their left hand.

In the early 1990s, there was controversy among researchers over whether left-handed people die earlier or whether it is due or not due to fewer left-handed people among the elderly. The debate was controversial and researchers argued that left-handedness was less common among the elderly because some left-handed people might die in accidents or injuries due to using objects made for right-handed people. Researchers also argued that left-handed people were less common among elderly people because people in the earlier 20th century often were forced to become right-handed, a practice that disappeared in the late 20th century.

In the late 20th century, many benefits were created for left-handed people in the United States: Specialty shops offering left-handed products appeared throughout the United States, and left-handed people could browse, in a counterclockwise direction if they wish, for such items as scissors and kitchen utensils. Additionally, public school and college purchasing agents specified that 10 percent of their desks are designed for left-handers.

== Equipment ==
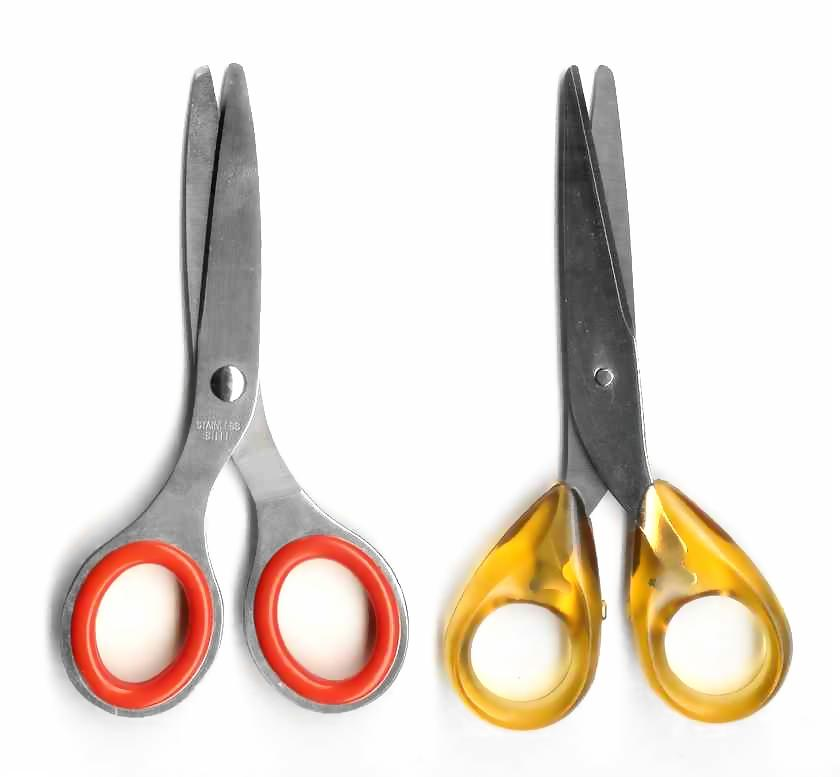
Left-handed (left) and right-handed scissors

Because most people are right-handed, most everyday items are mass-produced for ease of use with the right hand. Tools, game equipment, musical instruments and other items must be specially ordered for left-handed use, if they are even produced, and are usually more expensive than their right-handed counterparts. There are multiple specialty stores that sell only left-handed items.

=== Scissors ===
Right-handed scissors are arranged so that, in the right hand, the fingers and thumb push the blades together laterally, creating the shearing action essential to scissors' utility. In the left hand, however, fingers and thumb tend to force right-handed blades apart, so that, rather than being sheared, the work-material is merely hacked, as by a knife, or slips between the blades uncut. Left-handers using right-handed scissors will often try to compensate by forcing the handles apart laterally, causing discomfort or injury to the first knuckle of the thumb.

In addition, a right-handed person using right-handed scissors can easily see the cutting line, but for a left-handed user the upper blade obscures the view.

Many scissors are offered as "ambidextrous" or "suitable for right- or left-handed use". Typically, these are merely right-handed scissors with modified handles to permit use in the left hand with less discomfort, but because the blades are still arranged for right-handed use, they still do not perform as well in the left hand.

=== Guitar and Bass ===
Guitar technique followed the tradition of other stringed instruments such as the lute and banjo, where most players did simple chords and needed more dexterity in their right hand for arpeggios and strumming. With the advent of the modern guitar, the left hand has become more important in the playing of so-called “right-handed” guitars. Consequently, many naturally left-handed guitarists play right-handed guitar, and their dexterity is well documented . This is a partial list of prominent left-handed guitarists who play “right-handed:” Robert Fripp, Duane Allman, Gary Moore, Mark Knopfler, Steve Morse, Johnny Winters, Joe Perry, Michael Bloomfield, Danny Gatton, Jimmy Rainey, George Van Eps, Steve Cropper, Ted Greene, Neal Schon, Elvis Costello, Billy Corgan. Some left-handed guitarists prefer the instrument, but there are many more lefties playing righty than “lefty-lefties.” Because there aren’t as many produced, a disadvantage for “lefty-lefties” is the scarcity and added cost of left-handed instruments.

=== Computer input devices ===
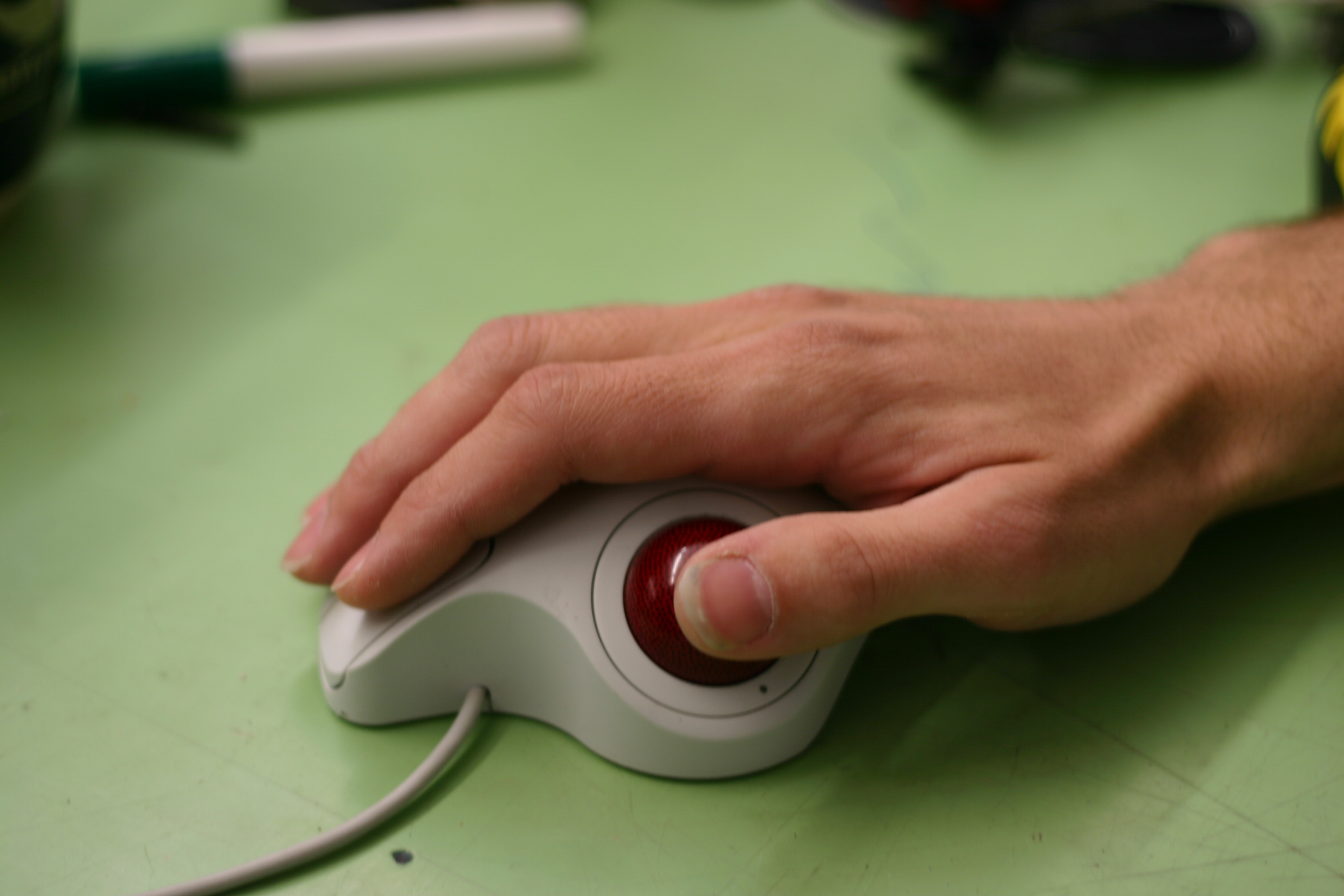
A right-handed trackball is difficult to use with the left hand.

Input devices for computers can present obstacles to left-handed operation if intended for right-handed use. Some computer set-ups have the mouse placed on the right side of the keyboard and unable to be repositioned to the left. The mouse itself is also sometimes shaped to fit the right hand better. The functions of mouse buttons, even on mice shaped to fit both hands, default to right-hand use. On two-button mice, the left button – under the index finger of a right-handed person – is the primary button, while the right button performs secondary functions. The on-screen pointers themselves are also configured for right-handed people. Most desktop operating systems allow a user to reverse the functionality of mouse buttons to accommodate left-handed use, but left-handed cursors sometimes need to be specially downloaded. Trackballs and touchpads are often shaped for right-handed use. Even with the ability to change the functionality of buttons, these devices may be difficult for left-handed use. For a left-handed person there are computer mice designed for left-handed use, but they are a much smaller segment of the marketplace.

Frequently used keyboard shortcuts are designed to be used with the left hand on a QWERTY keyboard and requires, for left-handed mouse users, that the left hand be moved from the mouse to the keyboard and back. Examples of this are Undo (Ctrl/Command+Z), Cut (Ctrl/Command+X), Copy (Ctrl/Command+C) and Paste (Ctrl/Command+V). Some of these shortcuts have right-handed alternatives, such as Ctrl+Insert and Shift+Insert for copy and paste (on Windows systems), but for Cut the corresponding shortcut is Shift+Delete in all applications except for Windows Explorer itself where it is used to permanently delete a file.

On standard keyboards, the numpad for entry of numbers is located at the right side of the keyboard making it hard to use for left handed users. Separate numpad keyboard that can be placed at the left side of the keyboard exist but are uncommon.

On public/shared computers (family, library, schools, shop floor, etc.) left-handed users are often forced to use the computer with a right-handed mouse.

Video game controllers often have the action buttons on the right with the directional controls on the left. In first-person shooters, many games default to the right pointer-finger being used to fire, simulating a right-handed person pulling the trigger of the weapon. Certain systems' layouts, such as Nintendo's Wii U and 3DS, have games in which right-handed stylus use is assumed and can cause difficulty for left-handed players.

=== Knives ===
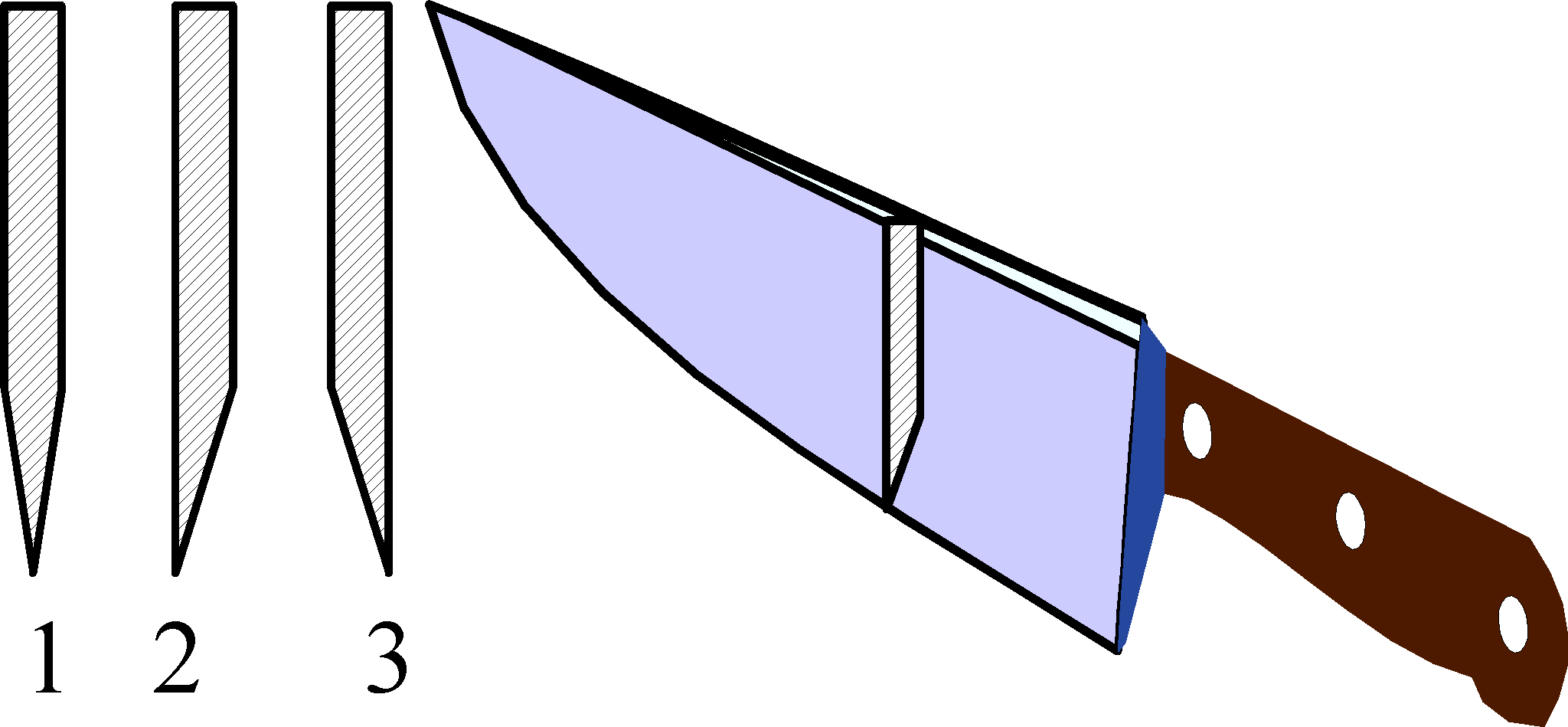
Kitchen knives: (1) symmetrical, (2) right-handed, (3) left-handed. Cross sections seen from the handle.

European-style kitchen knives with smooth, rather than serrated, edge are usually ground symmetrically; Japanese kitchen knives have the edge ground asymmetrically, with the cutting edge closer to the user's body with ratios of right- to left-handed blades ranging from 70 to 30 for the average chef's knife, to 90–10 for professional sushi chef knives. Left-handed models are rare: they can be specially ordered or custom made, or reground.

=== Sports ===
A left-handed individual may be known as a southpaw, particularly in a sports context. It is widely accepted that the term originated in the United States, in the game of baseball. Ballparks are often designed so that batters are facing east, so that the afternoon or evening sun does not shine in their eyes. This means that left-handed pitchers are throwing with their south-side arm. The Oxford English Dictionary lists a non-baseball citation for "south paw", meaning a punch with the left hand, as early as 1848, just three years after the first organized baseball game, with the note "(orig. U.S., in Baseball)".

A left-handed advantage in sports can be significant and even decisive, but this advantage usually results from a left-handed competitor's unshared familiarity with opposite-handed opponents. Baseball is an exception since batters, pitchers, and fielders in certain scenarios are physically advantaged or disadvantaged by their handedness. Unlike in most sports, where action occurs in a two-dimensional plane without regard to handedness, runners in baseball move around the bases counterclockwise (always turning to their left). This means that, in most infield situations, fielders can throw naturally across their body from the right hand but need to take extra time to move into a correct position to throw left-handed. Thus, there is a distinct disadvantage to throwing left-handed from the second base, shortstop, third base, or catcher's positions, and a slight advantage to being left-handed at first base. Conversely, being left-handed as a batter is an advantage as long as most pitchers are right-handed, because most breaking pitches move away from the pitcher's dominant hand, and opposite-handed batting neutralizes this advantage.

Left-handed hitters generally reach first base faster than right-handed hitters. They stand on the first-base side of home plate and have a head start of several feet, and their swing naturally orients them toward first base. This advantage gives left-handed hitters a better chance of turning a ground ball into an infield hit. Some baseball players, such as Christian Yelich of the Milwaukee Brewers, maximize these efficiencies by batting left-handed and throwing right-handed. Natural right-handers who learn in childhood to bat left-handed make up a substantial portion of all professional baseball players and nearly a third of all hitters named to all-star teams.

The game of golf is most commonly played right-handed, and left-handed players typically must provide their own special golf clubs. The game can be played with both hands, provided the player has both left- and right-handed clubs, giving an advantage over one-handed players. Professional golfer Phil Mickelson plays left-handed, although he is naturally right-handed.

Playing cards often have their pips printed only in the upper left corner assuming holding them with the right hand. Such design may be uncomfortable for left-handed people who may prefer all four corners of the card to be used.

In snooker, when Ronnie O'Sullivan played with his left hand in the 1996 World Championship against Alain Robidoux, the Canadian accused him of disrespect and refused to shake hands after the match. A disciplinary hearing was held, at which O'Sullivan was asked to show he could play left-handed at a professional level.

=== Machinery ===
Power tools, machinery and other potentially dangerous equipment is typically manufactured with the right-handed user in mind. Common problems faced by left-handed operators include the inability to keep materials steady, and difficulty reaching the on/off switch, especially in emergency situations. Table saws, whose blades protrude from the top of a table and pose the risk of losing fingers or hands, have their cutting area on the right side. This makes it difficult for a left-handed operator to guide the material being cut, as it must be pushed to the right side to align with the fence to avoid kickback. On bandsaws, the blade teeth are on the left side of the blade, necessitating the material being cut to be pushed from the left side of the machine. However, at this angle, the casing of the machine containing the rest of the blade is on the operator's left side, making it extremely difficult to guide the wood with their left hand.

Handheld circular saws are made almost exclusively for right-handers, with the motor and grip on the right side. If held in the left hand, it is impossible for the operator to see what they are cutting. Tool manufacturer Porter-Cable produces a left-handed circular saw that can be purchased relatively inexpensively.

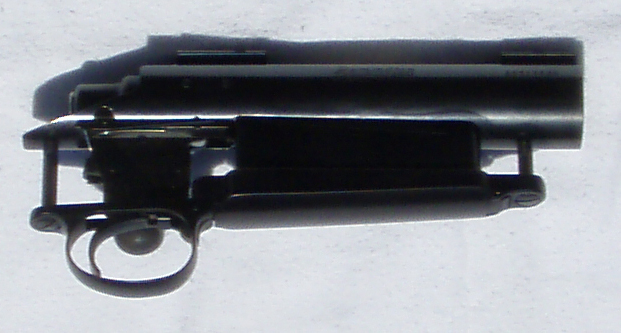
Left-handed Remington 700 rifle action—note that the bolt handle is not visible from this side.

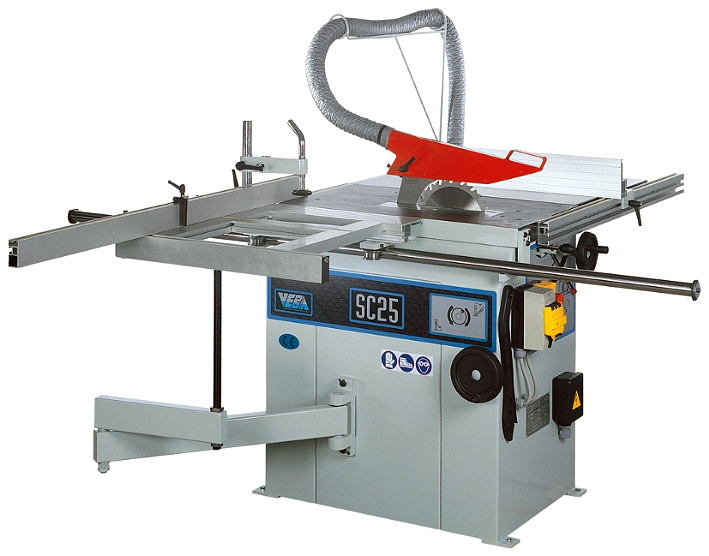
A table saw. Notice how the cutting surface, fence, etc. are on the right side.

== Language ==
=== Vocabulary ===
==== Ancient languages ====
Historically, the left side, and subsequently left-handedness, was considered negative. The word left itself derives from the Anglo-Saxon word lyft, 'weak'. In Ancient Greek both words meaning 'left' were euphemisms: the word ἀριστερός, aristerós (the standard word in Modern Greek as well) is derived from ἄριστος, áristos, 'best', and the word εὺώνυμος, euōnymos, 'of good name', is another euphemism used in lieu of 'ill-named'. The Latin adjective sinister originally meant 'left' but took on meanings of 'evil' or 'unlucky' by the Classical Latin era, and this double meaning survives in European derivatives of Latin, and in the English word sinister. Alternatively, sinister comes from the Latin word sinus meaning 'pocket': a traditional Roman toga had only one pocket, located on the left side. The right hand has historically been associated with skill: the Latin word for right-handed is dexter, as in 'dexterity', meaning manual skill. These words continue to be used in describing the points of a heraldic escutcheon where the right side of a field is referred to as dexter while the left side is sinister. Even the word ambidexterity reflects the bias. Its intended meaning is "skillful on both sides". However, since it keeps the Latin root dexter, which means 'right', it ends up conveying the idea of being "right-handed on both sides". This bias is also apparent in the lesser-known antonym ambisinistrous, which means 'left-handed [i.e., clumsy] on both sides'.

==== European languages ====
In many modern European languages, including English, the word for the direction right also means 'correct' or 'proper', and also stands for authority and justice. In more technical contexts, sinistral may be used in place of left-handed and sinistrality in place of left-handedness.

In French, droit(e) (cognate to English direct) means both 'right' and 'straight', as well as 'law' and the legal sense of 'right', while gauche means 'left' and is also a synonym of maladroit, literally 'not right', meaning 'clumsy'. Spanish, Italian, Portuguese and German have similar constructs. The Spanish term diestro and the Italian term destro mean both 'right-handed' and 'skillful'. The contemporary Italian word sinistra has both meanings of 'sinister' and 'left' (the masculine adjective for sinister being sinistro), and maldestro means 'clumsy'. The Spanish siniestra has both, too, although the 'left' meaning is less common and is usually expressed by izquierda, a Basque word that made its way into Portuguese as well. In some Spanish-speaking countries, to do something por izquierda means to engage in corrupt conduct or employ illegitimate means, whereas por derecha or a derechas means to do it the right (legitimate) way.

In Romanian drept/dreaptă (coming from Latin directus) means both 'right' and 'straight'. The word for 'left' is stâng/stângă, from Latin stancus (= stanticus) meaning 'tired'.

In German, recht means 'right' in both the adjectival sense (correct) and the nominal (legal entitlement). The word for 'left' is links, and is closely related to both link 'underhand, questionable', and linkisch 'clumsy'.

The Dutch words for 'left' (links, linker) and 'right' (recht, rechts, rechter) have much the same meanings and connotations as in English. The adjective link means 'cunning, shifty' or 'risky'. A linkerd is a 'crafty devil'. To look at someone over the left shoulder (iemand over de linkerschouder aanzien) is to regard him or her as insignificant.

In Irish, deas means 'right side' and 'nice'. Ciotóg is the left hand and is related to ciotach, 'awkward'; ciotógach (kyut-OH-goch) is the term for left-handed. In Welsh, the word chwith means 'left', but can also mean 'strange', 'awkward', or 'wrong'. The Scots term for left-handedness is corrie fistit. The term can be used to convey clumsiness.

==== Asian languages ====
In Chinese culture, the adjective 'left' (Chinese character: 左, Mandarin: zuǒ) sometimes means 'improper' or 'out of accord'. For instance, the phrase 'left path' (左道, zuǒdào) stands for unorthodox or immoral means.

In Korean, the word for 'right' is oreun (오른), to be compared to the word meaning 'morally proper', orheun (옳은), which shares the same pronunciation. The word for 'left' is oen (왼), which comes from oeda (외다), which means 'left and right reversed, twisted (of mind)', also 'wrong' in Middle Korean.

In Sanskrit, the word वाम, vāma stands for 'left', 'wicked', 'north' and 'opposite'.

In Hindi, left hand is called बायां हाथ, bayā haath. In Hebrew, as well as in other ancient Semitic and Mesopotamian languages, the term 'left' was a symbol of power or custody. There were also examples of left-handed assassins in the Old Testament (Ehud killing the Moabite king). The left hand symbolized the power to shame society, and was used as a metaphor for misfortune, natural evil, or punishment from the gods. This metaphor survived ancient culture and was integrated into mainstream Christianity by early Catholic theologians, such as Ambrose of Milan, to modern Protestant theologians, such as Karl Barth, to attribute natural evil to God in explaining God's omnipotence over the universe.

==== Australian Aboriginal languages ====
In the Eastern Arrernte, arratye means 'right' (as in akwe-arratye, 'right hand') as well as 'correct', 'real', 'straight' or 'true'. In Alyawarr, arraty shares the same meanings as its Eastern Arrernte equivalent (as in arraty-angkwarr, 'right hand' and arraty-antey, 'right way').

In Gurindji, jutu means 'right', 'right hand' and 'straight'. It is also the root word for jutumparra, which means both 'right-handed' and 'straight'.

In Tiwi, palinganyini (feminine: palinganyinga) means 'left-handed', but it can also be used to mean 'incorrect' (although jirti is a much more common term meaning 'bad' or 'incorrect').

In Walmajarri, the word for 'right hand' is mayakarti, which literally translates to 'strong side', while the word for 'left hand' is jampukarti, which literally translates to 'weak side'.

In Warlpiri, junga and yijardu both mean 'right' as well as 'actual', 'correct', 'straight' and 'true'.

In the Yolŋu languages, one word is used to mean 'right' or 'right hand' as well as 'correct', 'immediate', 'straight' and 'vertical'. The only difference is the spelling of the words: dhunupa in Djambarrpuyŋu, junupa in Djinang, and dhunupa in Golpa.

=== Expressions and colloquialisms ===
The left side is often associated with awkwardness and clumsiness. The Spanish expression tener dos pies izquierdos, in English, the expression "to have two left feet", refers to clumsiness in the domains of football or dancing. A "left-handed compliment" is considered one that is unflattering or dismissive in meaning. The Polish expression mieć dwie lewe ręce, Dutch twee linkerhanden hebben, German zwei linke Hände haben, Bulgarian dve levi ratse, French avoir deux mains gauches, Italian avere due mani sinistre, Hungarian kétbalkezes and Czech Mít obě ruce levé all mean 'to have two left hands'—that one is clumsy or is a very poor handyman; the English equivalent is 'to be all thumbs'. Moreover, the German idiom mit dem linken Fuß aufgestanden sein, the Spanish expression levantarse con el pie izquierdo, the French expression s'être levé du pied gauche, the Polish expression wstać lewą nogą and the Hungarian expression bal lábbal kelt fel (literally, 'to get up with the left foot') mean 'to have a bad day and do everything wrong or unsuccessfully', related to the English expression "to get up on the wrong side of the bed". The Welsh phrase tu chwith allan and the Polish expression na lewą stronę ('left side out') refers to an object being inside-out. In Russian and Polish, the use of the term nalyevo (na lewo in Polish) means 'on the left', but can also connote taking bribes or "sneaky" behavior. Balszerencse (lit. 'left luck') is Hungarian for 'bad luck'; balkézről született [person] (lit. 'born from the left hand') refers to an illegitimate child. In Hindi, the term left hand's play (Hindi: बाएँ हाथ का खेल, romanized: Bāēṁ hātha kā khēla) refers to a task that someone has perfected enough to perform with ease, implying the task is so easy, the person can perform it with the untrained hand.

There are many colloquial terms used to refer to a left-handed person, e.g. southpaw (USA). Some are just slang or jargon words, while other references may be offensive or demeaning, either in context or in origin. In some parts of the English-speaking world, cack-handed is slang for 'left-handed', and is also used to mean 'clumsy'. The origin of this term is disputed, but some suggest it is derived from the Latin cacare, in reference to the habit of performing ablutions with the left hand, leaving the right hand "clean". However, other sources suggest that it is derived from the Old Norse word keikr, meaning 'bent backwards'. British people frequently use cack-handed to mean 'clumsy', although it also means 'left-handed'.

== Civic life ==
=== Schooling ===
Because most students in public schools are right-handed, most commonly used implements are designed for right-handers, from pencil sharpeners to scissors to desks. The consequences to left-handed students can vary from decreased academic performance or physical ailments to nothing at all.

In many classrooms and lecture halls, desks are designed so that the writing surface is attached to the chair instead of separate from it. In this design, the desk is attached on the right side, offering an armrest for right-handed people to use while writing. In some of these desks, the writing surface does not extend fully to the left, necessitating a left-handed user to turn their body in order to write properly, sometimes causing back, neck and shoulder problems. This contorted posture may also cause the student to be accused of cheating.

This right-handed bias is reflected in standardized tests as well. Multiple-choice tests tend to put the question on the left side of the page and the answers on the right side. If the answers must be filled in within a separate booklet, it can be awkward and uncomfortable for a left-handed student to line up the booklet with the answers. The time it takes to find a comfortable, convenient position cuts into test-taking time, resulting in rushed answers and unchecked work.

The authors Ardila, Alfredo and Rosselli, and Diego claim that "Attending school results in a significant social pressure to use the right hand, not only in writing but also in other activities."

=== Employment ===
In research done on the relations of handedness and employment, researchers may start their experiments believing left-handers earn lower wages than their right-handed counterparts, due to effects such as difficulty using right-handed tools and increased risk of illness. However, their findings are more complex. In studies in the United States and United Kingdom, it was found that left-handed men earn more than right-handed men; about 5% more in the UK. Conversely, left-handed women earn about 7.5% less than right-handed women.

During the residency period in operation theatres, right-handed surgeons may be irritated by left-handed residents, and left-handed residents have lower performance scoring compared to their right-handed counterparts.

== See also ==
- Cross-dominance
- Footedness
- Laterality
- Ocular dominance (eyedness)
- Edinburgh Handedness Inventory
- Geschwind–Galaburda hypothesis
- Handedness and mathematical ability
- Musicians who play left-handed
- Situs inversus
- Southpaw stance (boxing)
- Handedness and sexual orientation
