= The Boston process approach =

Neurological assessment tool

The Boston Process Approach is a neurological assessment tool developed by Edith Kaplan and her colleagues, Harold Goodglass, Nelson Butters, Laird Cermak, and Norman Geschwind at the Boston Veterans Medical Center. The main purpose of the Boston Process Approach is to assess brain damage as well as cognitive impairments in patients through a series of tests that are related to memory, attention, intelligence, and other aspects of information processing. This approach is one of the more flexible and qualitative neurological assessments because it emphasizes how a patient performs a task instead of whether they succeeded or failed at it.

== Administration ==
In order to start this procedure, the neuropsychologist first looks at the participant’s behaviors and what kind of complications they may have. Based on the given information, the person performs a standardized test. While the participant is performing the test, the neuropsychologist examines how they are answering each question. The neuropsychologist scrutinizes the process to see if there are any intellectual problems exhibited. Alterations can be made to the test by simply adding, or lessening the time the person has to complete the test. After using the Boston process approach, the clinician looks at the outcomes to make conclusions on what is going on in the brain. These conclusions are based on the errors that occurred during the test. The point of looking at the errors is to see what issues may have occurred when trying to process the information and answer the question in order to evaluate the specific deficit(s). Certain inaccuracies may infer that there’s damage to a definite part of the brain, like speech difficulties implicating the speech area in the left hemisphere.

== Qualitative analysis ==
The qualitative analysis focuses on closely observing the process by which a patient arrives at a final answer. An example of qualitative analysis is in regard to the Block design test, which measures spatial visualization ability and motor skills. During the task the patient is asked to recreate a viewed pattern by arranging a set of blocks that have colored patterns on each side, The examiner observes the method by which the patient approaches and solves the problem, focusing, for example, on what quadrant the patient started at, which hand was used to arrange the blocks, whether the patient rotated the blocks on the table or had to lift them into space, if the image produced was either a mirror image or reversal of the pattern that the patient was supposed to create, and which side the patient made more errors on. This is considered qualitative analysis because it focuses on how the patient came to their final design, rather than the final design itself.

== Modifications ==
The modifications made to standardized tests can include repetition of test questions and allowing more time than allotted in the standardized version. Many standardized tests have been subject to process-based modifications. There are many types of modifications that have been created for the battery approach, but not all of them are listed. Some of the main modifications are listed below:

- Wechsler Adult Intelligence Scale Revised as a Neuropsychological Instrument (WAIS-R NI)
- Wechsler Intelligence Scale for Children (WISC-IV)
- Wisconsin Card Sorting Test (WCST)
- Wechsler Memory Scale-Revised (WMS-R)
- California Verbal Learning Test (CVLT)
- Rey-Osterrieth Complex Figure (ROCF)
- Consonant Trigrams Test
- Boston Naming Test (BNT)
- Judgment of Line Orientation (JLO)
- Wide Range Achievement Test (WRAT4)
- Stroop Task
- Weiner, MF; Hynan, LS; Rossetti, H; Falkowski, J (2011). "Luria's three-step test: what is it and what does it tell us?". Int Psychogeriatr. 23 (10): 1602–6. doi:10.1017/S1041610211000767. PMC 3399685. PMID 21554794.
- Geriatric Evaluation of Mental Status

== Interpretation ==
The Boston process approach is known to be a flexible battery approach when assessing brain function of a person, meaning that there can be many different standardized tests that can be administered to the individual depending on their existing deficiencies. Data interpretation from this approach does not necessarily look at the final score on the tests, rather it focuses on what kind of errors were made by the individual during the assessment. Results from the Boston process approach allow the clinician to make inferences about what brain areas may not be working properly in the individual. The clinician can then also make inferences about how severe the damage to the brain is by determining whether there is low-level or higher-level deficits in their cognitive processing.

== Critiques ==
A major criticism of this approach is on its external validity. The problems occur due to differences in outcome between administrators. There have also been issues in regards to the lack of consistent patterns and methods for each diagnosis (Milberg & Hebben, 2013). This neuropsychological flexible battery approach allows for administrators to choose which tests they want to use, however, it makes room for the lack of consistency in choosing the tests for each type of neurological issue. Accordingly, there are questions about the empirical validity of the Boston Process Approach. With that being said, the Boston Process Approach revolutionized the field of clinical psychology and is still widely used today (Milberg & Hebben, 2013).
