= Adele Diamond =

American neuroscientist

Adele Diamond OC FRSC
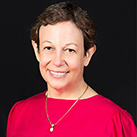
- Born: Adele Dorothy Diamond; New York City, New York
- Education: Swarthmore College; Harvard University
- Spouse: Donald Druin
- Scientific career
- Fields: Developmental cognitive neuroscience
- Workplaces: University of British Columbia
- Thesis: Behavior changes between 6 to 12 months of age: what can they tell us about how the mind of the infant is changing? (1983)
- Doctoral advisor: Jerome Kagan
- Website: www.devcogneuro.com

Adele Dorothy Diamond OC FRSC is a professor of neuroscience at the University of British Columbia, where she holds a Tier 1 Canada Research Chair in Developmental Cognitive Neuroscience. Her research focuses on the development of executive functions, cognitive flexibility, working memory & inhibitory control [selective attention & self-control, and the biological and environmental factors that influence them, particularly in children.

She was appointed an Officer of the Order of Canada for contributions to developmental cognitive neuroscience and research on executive functions. In September of 2014, Adele was recognized by the Online Psychology Degree Guide by being ranked 13th of the top 30 Most Influential Neuroscientists Alive Today.

== Early life and education ==
Adele Diamond grew up in Brooklyn and Queens where she attended public schools (PS 165, Parsons Junior High, and John Bowne High School). She graduated from John Bowne High School.

She attended Swarthmore College on a four-year Swarthmore National Scholarship and graduated in 1975, majoring in sociology, anthropology, and psychology. In 1972, while still at Swarthmore, she attended the London School of Economics.

Diamond did her PhD graduate work at Harvard University (graduating in 1983) and her postdoctoral fellowship at Yale Medical School with a four-year NSF Graduate Fellowship and a three-year Danforth Graduate Fellowship.

Although she was officially a PhD candidate in psychology, she spent her first four years of graduate school working primarily in anthropology and sociology. After an initial foray into psychology, she turned to neuroscience. Diamond hypothesized that maturational changes in the brain's prefrontal cortex made possible the impressive cognitive advances seen between 6 and 12 months of age. Nelson Butters from the Boston VA aided her in her research on cognitive neuroscience .

== Research ==
Diamond's team discovered a long-lasting visual deficit if children with phenylketonuria are not started on a low-phenylalanine diet within days of birth (the norm had been to start them within two weeks of birth).

Diamond has received federal funding for research for over 40 years in a row. She has also overseen more than $24 million dollars in research funding throught this time frame.

Much of Diamond's work has started with the premise that even though a child may appear incapable of doing or understanding something, if the question is posed differently or the concept taught in new ways, the child can succeed. Her research has also exemplified that you can view and assess executive functions from as early as the first year of life. Interventions of such functions can help improve these abilities in young children too. Diamond illustrated this approach first with infants' understanding of the concept of contiguity, then with their ability to grasp abstract concepts, and next with children's ability to succeed on a Stroop-like task requiring memory and inhibition. Her work focuses on how executive functions can allow individuals to control impulses, resist temptations, maintain focus, adapt to changing demands, and problem solve. Diamond's work has been fundamental in creating one of the first effective MRI scans for prefrontal activity in children participating tasks to help understand human development. The Djavad Mowafaghian Centre for Brain Health highlights Diamond's TEDxWestVancouverED talk in 2014 where she discusses the importance executive functions and the impact it has on student learning.

In December of 2025, Thai researchers created a new self-evaluation measure based on Diamond's own Behavioral Inventory Measure of Executive Functions. These evaluations relied on a series of tests that assessed factors like inhibitory control, working memory, cognitive flexibility, and several other various subcomponents.Through these tests a panel of experts were able to measure executive functions and how they develop, differ among age and sex, and its psychometric properties.

In January 2026, Annual Review of Psychology listed the 2013 review article "Executive functions" among its "Highly Downloaded Articles," based on download data from the previous 12 months.

In 2026, Diamond was a co-author for a study from Advanced Sciences that examined differences in brain activity and cognitive performance among 96 children who attended traditional schools.

== Selected awards and honors ==
In December 2025, she was appointed an Officer of the Order of Canada, one of the country's highest civilian honors.

That citation read: "Adele Diamond is a groundbreaking researcher and co-founder of the field of developmental cognitive neuroscience. Through collaborations integrating diverse disciplines and her talent for knowledge translation, she has transformed our understanding of early cognitive development and the brain's prefrontal cortex. She has also shaped social policies, and improved medical and educational practices worldwide."

Also in 2025, Diamond received a Doctor of Humane Letters degree from the Erikson Institute's Graduate School in Child Development in Chicago.

The citation accompanying this award described her as a "ground-breaking researcher who changed the way we think about cognitive development in very young children" and noted that she co-founded the field of developmental cognitive neuroscience.

This was the fourth honorary degree awarded to Diamond. The other three are:

- Honorary Doctor of Science degree (*honoris causa*) from the University of Cambridge in the United Kingdom in 2024.
- Honorary Doctor of Science degree from Swarthmore College in the United States in 2020.
- Honorary Doctor of Philosophy degree (*honoris causa*) from Ben-Gurion University of the Negev in Israel in 2015.

Her other honors include:

- Election as a Fellow of the Royal Society of Canada in 2009.
- In the same year, receipt of a YWCA Woman of Distinction Award, recognized nationally as an important award for women.
- Recipient of the Inaugural Distinguished Achievement Award for Service to the University and Community from the Faculty of Medicine, University of British Columbia.
- Recipient of the Urie Bronfenbrenner Award for Lifetime Contributions to Developmental Psychology in the Service of Science and Society from the American Psychological Association in 2014.
- In the same year, recognition as one of the 15 most influential neuroscientists alive today, and the only woman ranked within the top 23.
- Recipient of the Translation Award, the highest honor of the International Mind, Brain and Education Society, in 2016.
- Recipient of the Huttenlocher Award, the highest honor of Flux (the International Society for Developmental Cognitive Neuroscience), in 2022.
- Holder of a Tier 1 Canada Research Chair for more than ten years.

In 2019, Diamond's impact ranked in top 0.01% of scientists.

In 2024, Cambridge University awarded her with honorary Doctor of Science, a degree granted to scholars whose work has made exceptional impact on both a national and international level.

The Adele Diamond Foundation was established in her honor to support efforts in providing quality education to Maasai children in East Africa.
