= Jerre =

Jerre is a given name. Notable people with the given name include:

- Jerre Denoble (1923–2011), American outfielder who played for the All-American Girls
- Jerre Levy (born 1938), American psychologist
- Jerre Mangione (1909–1998), American writer
- Jerre Noe (1923–2005), American computer scientist
- Jerre Stockton Williams (1916–1993), United States federal judge
