= Handedness and mathematical ability =

Potential link between human handedness and mathematical ability

Researchers have suggested a link between handedness and ability with mathematics. This link has been proposed by Geschwind, Galaburda, Annett, and Kilshaw. The suggested link is that a brain without extreme bias towards locating language in the left hemisphere would have an advantage in mathematical ability.

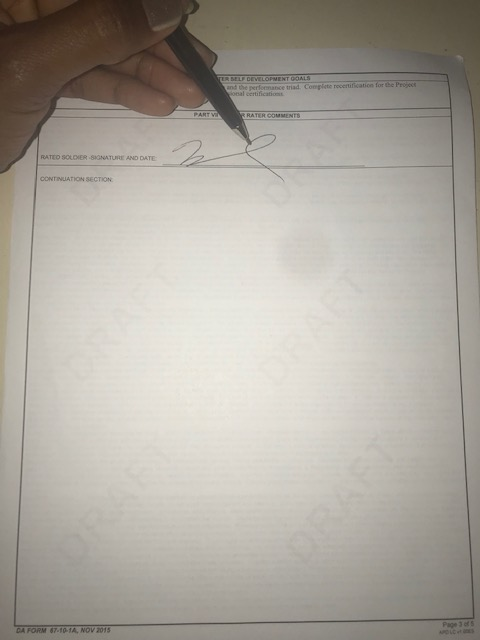
Left hand signature

== Body of research ==
=== Douglas study ===
A 1967 study by Douglas found no evidence to correlate mathematical ability with left-handedness or ambidexterity. The study compared the people who came in the top 15% of a mathematics examination with those of moderate mathematical ability, and found that the two groups' handedness preferences were similar. However, it did find that those who came lowest in the test had mixed hand preferences. A study in 1979 by Peterson found a trend towards low rates of left-handedness in science students.

=== Jones and Bell study ===
A 1980 study by Jones and Bell also obtained negative results. This study compared the handedness of a group of engineering students with strong mathematics skills against the handedness of a group of psychology students (of varying mathematics skills). In both cases, the distribution of handedness resembled that of the general population.

=== Annett and Kilshaw study ===
Annett and Kilshaw themselves support their hypothesis with several examples, including a handedness questionnaire given to undergraduates. Annett observes that studies that depend from voluntary returns of a handedness questionnaire are going to be biased towards left-handedness, and notes that this was a weakness of the study. However, the results were that there were significantly more left-handers amongst male mathematics undergraduates than male non-mathematics undergraduates (21% versus 11%) and significantly more non-right-handers (44% versus 24%), and that there was a similar but smaller left-handedness difference for female undergraduates (11% versus 8%). Annett reports the results of this study as being consistent with the hypothesis, for explaining the cause of handedness, of an absent genetic right-shift factor.

Other examples used by Annett include a study that observed the hand use of teachers of mathematics and other sciences from various universities and polytechnics, as they underwent a personal interview, compared to a control group comprising non-mathematics teachers. Again, a statistically significant difference was found for males, and again Annett states this to be consistent with the right-shift model. Further examples are a 1986 study by Benbow and a 1990 study by Temple of staff at the University of Oxford, which, Annett states, show not that there is a predominance of left-handers in talented groups, whether that talent be with mathematics or otherwise, but rather that there is a shortfall in such groups of people who are strongly right-handed.

=== Benbow study ===
A study by C. P. Benbow did not work to prove the mathematical abilities of study participants who are left-hand dominant but to prove the weakness in those who are right-hand dominant. Using a series of questions that relate left-handedness and mathematical giftedness, Benbow was able to base their team's conclusion off of a series of questions that associated hand dominance and mathematical ability.

=== Ongoing debate ===
As a controversial subject, the debate over the link between handedness and mathematical abilities is ongoing. Researchers at the University of Liverpool concluded that there is a moderate, yet significant correlation between mathematical skills and handedness.

== See also ==
- Laterality
