= Cognitive effects of bilingualism =

Impact of a second language on mental processes

Bilingualism, a subset of multilingualism, means having proficiency in two languages. A bilingual individual is traditionally defined as someone who understands and produces two languages on a regular basis. A bilingual individual's initial exposure to both languages may start in early childhood, e.g. before age 3, but exposure may also begin later in life, in monolingual or bilingual education. Equal proficiency in a bilingual individuals' languages is rarely seen as it typically varies by domain. For example, a bilingual individual may have greater proficiency for work-related terms in one language, and family-related terms in another language.

Being bilingual has been linked to a number of cognitive benefits. Research on how a bilingual individual's first language (L1) and second language (L2) interact shows that both languages have an influence on the function of one another and on cognitive function outside of language. Research on executive functions like working memory, perception, and attentional and inhibitory control, suggests that bilinguals can benefit from significant cognitive advantages over monolingual peers in various settings. There are also age-related benefits which seem to protect against cognitive decline in older adults.

Throughout the history of research into the cognitive advantages of bilingualism, views have shifted from a subtractive to an additive perspective: it is now believed that being bilingual adds to an individual's abilities rather than subtracting from it.

There is, however, strong disagreement over how findings on this subject should be interpreted. Systematic reviews and meta-analyses of executive functioning studies have failed to find compelling evidence for cognitive advantages in healthy adults or in participants across a broader age range. Moreover, the distribution of effect sizes in meta-analyses suggest publication bias, or that the reporting of bilingualism effects on executive functioning give a distorted view of the evidence.

== History ==
According to the Singapore Management University (SMU) School of Social Sciences, research before the 1960s on bilingual individuals varied but commonly supported the idea that there were disadvantages to bilingualism. Researchers believed that bilinguals would have smaller vocabularies and stunted cognitive abilities. They also thought that children learning two languages at a young age would struggle differentiating and building proficiency in two languages to become competent in either. The idea that being bilingual was harmful to a child's linguistic and cognitive development, persisted. According to a historical review in "The Journal of Genetic Psychology," various researchers held these beliefs, noting a "problem of bilingualism" or the "handicapping influence of bilingualism." Following studies reported that bilinguals performed worse in IQ tests and suffered in most aspects of language development. These perspectives on bilingualism may have come from studies that did not control for socioeconomic status (SES) and gave IQ tests to non-proficient speakers of a second language in that second language. Many of these studies also used unstandardized and subjective definitions of bilingualism and of a bilingual individual, labeling someone as bilingual or monolingual through assumptions based on parent national origin, or based on family name.

Researchers began to change tone in the late 1950s/early 1960s, when Lenneberg, Chomsky, and Halle co-founded the field of biolinguistics and explored the role of biology in language. Their ideas led others to consider the role of human development more. In 1962, a turning point came about from a study that emphasized the importance of controlling for factors like age, sex, and SES, as well as of having a standardized measure for bilingualism when selecting a sample of bilinguals to be studied. Researchers carefully matched bilingual to monolingual participants and found that the bilinguals appeared to have significant advantages to that of their monolingual peers, outperforming in both verbal and non-verbal tests, more specifically in the non-verbal tests. In continuation of this study, research after this point began to shift focus, investigating areas of cognitive development and aptitude like perception and executive functioning. In 1967, publication of Lenneberg's seminal book, Biological Foundations of Language, first introduced the idea of a critical period of language acquisition, now better known as a sensitive period and further influenced bilingualism ideas. In 1977 the American Institutes for Research published an influential study which discussed bilingualism as it relates to education - how it affects a child's performance compared to peers. This study played a large role in our understanding of multilingualism and the effects that it has on the brain.

Since the late 1970s, researchers have found more cognitive benefits of bilingualism, including better attention, task-switching, and protection against aging declines. Over time, the prevalence of bilinguals in the United States has also increased. While the United States Census Bureau does not directly poll for bilingualism, they do poll for household languages. Non-English-speaking households are also surveyed for English proficiency. A 2012 interpretation of Census Bureau results observed that 11% of the population was bilingual in 1980, 14% in 1990, and 20% in 2012.

== Cognitive advantages ==
=== Executive function ===
Executive function is the group of high-level cognitive processes that assists in goal-oriented tasks, such as problem solving, mental flexibility, attentional control, inhibitory control, and task switching. Much of the current research on cognitive effects of bilingualism studies the potential relationship between bilingualism and executive function; monolinguals and bilinguals may have executive function differences. Studies that match age and background factors like SES have found that bilinguals, who experience the mental demands of learning multiple languages, may have greater executive control and experience other cognitive benefits than their monolingual peers. Executive function may also have effects for older adults. Adults who learned a second language at a young age show better control and inhibitory processing than monolingual adults, as well as greater protection from cognitive decline such as dementia. Notably, some scientists continue to debate whether a bilingual advantage in executive functioning exists, with some studies and meta-analyses coming to opposite conclusions.

==== Bimodal bilinguals ====
Unimodal bilinguals are individuals who are proficient in two spoken languages. In contrast, bimodal bilinguals are individuals who are proficient in languages in differing modalities (i.e. a spoken and signed language). Studies have indicated that unimodal and bimodal bilinguals face different factors and requirements for their language use. In a monolingual conversational situation, unimodal bilinguals must suppress their use of one of their languages more significantly than bimodal bilinguals, while using the other language. This is because the use of a spoken word in another language would be confusing to the listener, whereas the use of a signed word would be less distracting to a listener, even when they do not know the meaning of the sign.

In 1998, David Green proposed his "inhibitory control model", which references a bilingual's constant need to suppress one language while using another. Because this task requires suppressing a source of distraction, this kind of control is then applied to other tasks. This assertion was bolstered by a study comparing unimodal bilinguals and bimodal bilinguals. Because bimodal bilinguals can express themselves in both languages at the same time, they may require less inhibition. This idea was supported by the results of the study; only unimodal bilinguals were found to have an advantage, as measured by the flanker task (a cognitive task that measures attentional focus and inhibition). Bimodal bilinguals also switch languages less frequently, because they are more likely to use both languages at once than to completely switch from one to the other. For this reason, the researchers of this study hypothesized that it may be the switching between languages that gives unimodal bilinguals the advantage.

===== Bilingualism vs. executive control =====
Hakuta and Diaz addressed an origin question about the potential bilingual advantage: do children with greater cognitive abilities tend to learn more than one language, or could knowing more than one language contribute to enhanced cognition? They administered Raven's Progressive Matrices, a set of non-verbal tests designed to measure cognitive ability, to a bilingual sample of children. Results showed their sample had a higher correlation with the degree of bilingualism, or language proficiency, and test scores. Accordingly, this study suggested that the "egg came first", or that bilingualism predicts cognitive ability through performance. Furthermore, native bilinguals often learn a second language due to family environment, where use of the two languages is necessary. It is less likely that children learn second languages in monolingual households through individual, innate cognitive abilities.

==== Bilingualism advantage controversy ====
The idea that bilingualism enhances executive function is not universally accepted among researchers. Mixed experimental results have led to bitter, opposing views.

The research methodologies of both groups for and against bilingualism advantages have been disputed. Some opposing researchers argue that correlations between bilingualism and executive function are inconsistent due to a reliance on findings with small sample sizes, publication bias, and non-uniform definitions. Furthermore, they argue that bilinguals are not consistently better at all executive function tasks and existing studies only compare bilinguals to monolinguals, and not bilinguals of different proficiencies. Conversely, researchers in support of a bilingualism advantage note that while tests of executive function may undermine the robustness of findings, opposing findings come from researchers outside of the bilingualism field, and new neuroimaging technologies robustly verify and build upon historical findings of a bilingualism advantage.

=== Parallel activation of both languages ===
Bilinguals often have more knowledge in certain language domains, leading to a dominant "L1" language, and a less dominant "L2" language. Research shows that when a bilingual individual proficient in both uses only L1 or L2, both languages are simultaneously active, phonologically and semantically, and share overlapping neural representations This activation is shown by electrophysiological measures of performance when listening to speech, reading words in either language or even planning speech in either language. Bilingualism studies historically looked at languages that share the Roman alphabet, where co-activation of languages may make more intuitive sense. However, co-activation of L1 and L2 has also been reported in bilinguals whose two languages have different scripts (writing systems), lexical forms (e.g. Japanese and English), and modality (e.g. English and American Sign Language).

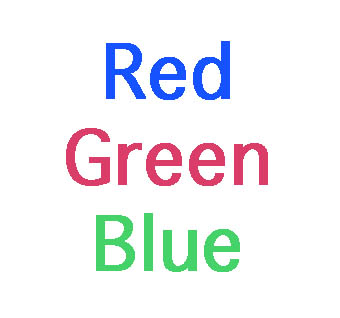
The Stroop task, which shows color names in a different color, tests inhibition and distraction.

The fact that both languages are constantly activated means that they potentially compete for cognitive resources; bilinguals need a way to control the competition, to not use the wrong language at the wrong time. Inhibition refers to being able to ignore irrelevant information and therefore not be distracted by non-target stimuli. Inhibition may be the executive control system that allows successful linguistic selection even when both languages are co-activated in bilinguals. De Groot & Christofells (2006) proposed a distinction between two types of inhibition that may occur: global inhibition and local inhibition. Global inhibition refers to suppression of an entire language system, e.g. inhibiting Spanish when speaking English, and local inhibition refers to inhibition of a more specific competing vocabulary, e.g. the translation of the same word or phrase. Local inhibition mostly affects linguistic performance whereas global inhibition affects both linguistic and cognitive performance.

Inhibiting language in different ways may impact non-linguistic and linguistic cognitive processing. For example, a test that is widely used to assess this executive function is the Stroop task, where the word for a color is printed in a different color than the name (e.g. the word 'red' printed in blue ink). This causes interference and distraction; reaction times are measured to see how distracted the individual is by the incongruent word and color. Bilinguals compared to monolinguals have shown better Stroop task performance, suggesting that bilinguals have a more developed inhibition process, potentially due to the constant inhibition of their non-target language.

=== Abilities related to executive function ===
Bilingual individuals have also shown advantages in metalinguistic ability, which seems closely tied to executive function. Metalinguistic awareness is the understanding of the separation between language's structure and its meaning. For example, being able to judge the grammaticality of a sentence regardless of whether it is sensical, or being able to separate the set of sounds comprising a word from the word's meaning. Metalinguistic awareness involves inhibition, or the ability to suppress distracting information such as semantics. Metalinguistic ability could also be exercised by being bilingual, given that a bilingual individual has to suppress their knowledge of another language system when operating in one of their languages.

Improved theory of mind, which is the ability to understand someone else's thinking, has also been implicated in bilingualism. A meta-analysis in 2018 found that bilingual children performed better on a theory of mind test compared to monolingual children.

== Benefits in older age ==
There has been a growing research interest in the benefits of bilingualism against age-related cognitive decline. Klein & Viswanathan found that the normal decrease in attention control observed in older adults was reduced in bilinguals, suggesting that bilingualism may protect against age-related cognitive deficits. Elderly bilinguals show better task-switching skill, can ignore unrelated information, and can choose the best phrasing. Bilingualism may be one of the environmental factors which contributes to 'cognitive reserve'. Cognitive reserve is the idea that engaging in stimulating physical or mental activity can maintain cognitive functioning in healthy aging and delay the onset of dementia-related memory losses. Contributing factors include education, occupational status, higher socioeconomic class, and doing physical, intellectual and social activities.

To test the protection of bilingualism against Alzheimer's disease (AD), Bialystok et al. (2007) examined hospital records of monolingual and bilingual patients who were diagnosed with various types of dementia. After controlling for various cognitive factors, the researchers found bilinguals experienced later onset of symptoms and were diagnosed approximately 3–4 years later on average than monolinguals. This was replicated with patients all diagnosed with AD. Note that the studies did not show that bilingualism directly prevents one from having AD, but rather enables functional cognition for a longer period of time, delaying symptom onset for those with the disease. For example, in one Alzheimer study, bilinguals actually had more pathology (signs of disease) and damage than the monolingual patients. This suggests that active use of the two languages protects against the symptoms of the disease. Areas of the brain that enable cognitive control may have benefited from the bilingual experience and so improve cognitive function in older age.

Several other studies replicated the finding that bilingualism contributes to cognitive reserve. For example, Abutalebi et al. (2015) used the flanker test to study unimodal bilinguals and monolinguals matched based on education level and SES. While this study had a relatively small sample size, the results did confirm previous research findings: the bilinguals outperformed the monolinguals on all experimental tasks, and the monolinguals' neural imaging showed more signs of age-related effects on performance of tasks and less gray matter density, which is associated with memory and function losses. Conversely, the bilinguals' neural imaging showed more gray matter density.

== Age of acquisition ==
A debate within the linguistic community is whether the age of acquiring one's L2 has effects on the cognitive advantages. Bilingual children who acquire an L2 early may develop executive function earlier, around age 3, compared to monolingual hearing children who develop executive function around age 4 or 5. Native bilingual children who develop proficiency in L1 and L2 at the same time, perform better on executive function tasks such as the Attention Network Test, which measures attentional control, compared to their late bilingual and monolingual counterparts in studies controlled for age, verbal ability, and SES.

== Language ==
=== Language use ===
Leopold, a pioneer of child language and bilingualism research, made many research findings by observing his daughter's, Hildegard, language use. In his studies, he observed that Hildegard had "loose connections" between the (phonetic) structure of words and their semantics (meaning) because of her frequent substitutions of English words with German words and vice versa. This was noted in her everyday speech and well-rehearsed songs or rhymes. He noted that she had a greater flexibility in the use of language that was unobserved in monolingual children of her age. Leopold considered that perhaps this loose connection between the meaning and form of a word could result in more abstract thinking or greater mental flexibility for bilingual children. Following this study, several others were formed to test similar things and find out more about the mental abilities of bilinguals with relation to their languages.

=== Semantic development ===
Anita Ianco-Worrall, author of Bilingualism and Cognitive Development, designed a study to test Leopold's observations and was able to replicate them. She tested two groups of monolingual and bilingual children at ages 4–6 and 6–9. These participants were given tasks to assess whether they showed a semantic or phonetic preference when categorizing words. An example of one task given in the study was to decide which of the two words, either can or hat, was more similar to the word cap. The semantic choice would be hat while the phonetic choice would be can. Other tasks were designed to provide a choice between semantic and phonetic interpretation of objects. For instance, in a hypothetical situation, could you call a cow a dog and if you did, would this dog bark?

The results of Ianco-Worrall's study showed that although both monolingual and bilingual children had no differences in the way they understood the words used, 54% of the younger bilingual children consistently showed a semantic preference in contrast to their monolingual peers. In monolingual children, semantic preference increased with age, suggesting that bilingual children reach a stage of semantic development 2–3 years earlier than their monolingual peers. This finding is in stark contrast to the early research and claims about bilingualism, which warned that bilingualism stunts children's linguistic development.

=== Language structure and awareness ===
In their book In Other Words, Ellen Bialystok and Kenji Hakuta, both professors studying bilingualism, examined the idea that "the knowledge of two languages is greater than the sum of its parts." They argued that there are linguistic benefits to being bilingual and that they are more than simply being able to speak two languages. A child learning two languages whose structures and rules are significantly different from each other requires the child to think in cognitively demanding ways. An example of this cognitive demand in action would be in the arbitrariness of labels for objects, or distinguishing between and using two different grammatical or syntactical structures. These areas are quite difficult for a child to learn, but with development through childhood, have been shown to increase the understanding the structure of language and introduce a greater awareness of meaning. Bilinguals develop what is referred to as metalinguistic awareness.

=== Reading ability ===
Bilingualism may also affect reading ability. Bialystok observed bilingual children's reading abilities and how the children made connections between the spoken and written language systems. Children were given a "Moving Word Task," where they needed to appropriately match a written word to an object on a card. Correctly matching the two after cards were rearranged suggested that the child could understand the written words as representations of specific words whose meanings cannot change. Comparisons to monolinguals suggested a literacy advantage, as the bilingual children achieved scores equal to monolinguals one year older. This may be attributed to greater connections between spoken and written languages. Other bilingual researchers found a relationship between phonological awareness and word recognition in native Spanish-speaking children learning to read English; phonological and word skills predicted how well a child could recognize English words. This suggested bilinguals could apply phonological awareness developed in L1 to the reading ability in L2.

=== Vocabulary ===
Past research suggests that bilinguals have a smaller vocabulary size than their monolinguals counterparts. However, a 2022 meta-analysis casts doubt on this by showing that there are no linguistic costs in bilinguals who have acquired two languages early in life; rather the linguistic cost is mainly seen in L2 learners when tested in their second language. Given that bilinguals accumulate vocabulary from both their languages, when taking both languages into account, they have a much larger vocabulary than monolinguals. However, within each language bilinguals have a smaller vocabulary size and take longer to name pictures as seen in standardized vocabulary tests, such as the Peabody Picture Vocabulary Test and Boston Naming task. A possible explanation may be that the frequency of use of words is related to increased lexical accessibility, meaning that words that are used more frequently are accessed more quickly. Past research attributing proficiency differences between bilinguals and monolinguals from smaller vocabulary and language usage time may have too small of a focus within one language, and not broaden consideration to total knowledge in both languages. In addition, the need to select the appropriate language system makes ordinary linguistic processing more effortful. The simple act of retrieving a common word is more effortful for bilinguals than monolinguals due to the competition of the two languages.

Bialystok, Luk, Peets, and Yang's study from 2010 notes that certain vocabulary tests could yield artificially low scores for bilingual children according to the domain from which the test words are taken. For example, the research team found that monolingual and bilingual 6-year-olds in their study had similar scores on English words that were associated with schooling. However, when the children were tested on English words that were associated with the home, the scores were significantly lower for the bilingual (English-Spanish) children. The researchers interpret this result as reflecting an asymmetry in vocabulary domains and language exposure: monolingual and bilingual children were equally exposed to the school context in the same language (English), but English was not commonly used in the home environments of the bilingual children. Language context may play a greater role in domain proficiency than overall language proficiency.

=== Effects on L1 from prolonged exposure to L2 ===
It has been suggested that prolonged naturalistic exposure to L2 affects how L2 is processed, but it may also affect how the L1 is processed. For example, in immersion contexts, the individual experiences reduced access to L1 and extensive contact with L2, which affects and facilitates processing of L2. However, this may also consequently affect processing of their L1, such as with increased difficulty in naming objects and phonology.

To test this hypothesis, Dussias & Sagarra (2007) investigated how individuals interpreted temporarily ambiguous phrases. For example, Alguien disparó al hijo de la actriz que estaba en el balcón = Someone shot the son of the actress who was on the balcony. When asked the question, ¿Quien estaba en el balcón? = Who was on the balcony?, monolingual Spanish speakers will typically answer el hijo = the son as they have a high attachment preference, meaning they attach the modifier to the "higher" verb phrase [shot the son]. This differs from monolingual English speakers who will typically answer the actress as they have a low attachment preference, meaning they attach the modifier to the "lower" verb phrase [the actress who was on the balcony]. The researchers found that Spanish-English bilinguals in a Spanish-speaking environment showed preference for the typical Spanish high-attachment strategy. However, Spanish-English bilinguals in an English-speaking environment showed preference for the typical English low-attachment strategy, even when reading the phrase in Spanish, their dominant language. This may be because they have more exposure to English constructions, making it more available to them. But altogether, this supports the idea that the L2, English in this case, is affecting the way the native Spanish speakers use their L1.

== See also ==
- Multilingualism
- Simultaneous bilingualism
