= Daniel Geschwind =

American geneticist

Daniel H. Geschwind
- Education: Dartmouth College, Yale School of Medicine
- Awards: Derek Denny-Brown Neurological Scholar Award from the American Neurological Association (2004); member of the Institute of Medicine; Sarnat Prize (2022)
- Scientific career
- Fields: Human genetics, neurogenetics
- Workplaces: University of California, Los Angeles
- Doctoral advisor: Susan Hockfield

Daniel H. Geschwind is an American physician-scientist whose laboratory has made pioneering discoveries in the biology of brain disorders and the genetic and genomic analyses of the nervous system.

His laboratory showed that gene co-expression has a reproducible network structure that can be used to understand neurobiological mechanisms in health, evolution, and disease. He led the first studies to define the molecular pathology of autism spectrum disorder (ASD) and several other psychiatric disorders, and has made major contributions to defining the genetic basis of autism.

Currently, he is the Gordon and Virginia MacDonald Distinguished Professor of Human Genetics, Neurology and Psychiatry at the David Geffen School of Medicine at the University of California, Los Angeles (UCLA). He also directs the UCLA Neurogenetics Program and the UCLA Center for Autism Research and Treatment (CART). Since March 2016 he has served as the Senior Associate Dean and Associate Vice Chancellor for Precision Health at UCLA.

== Education ==
Geschwind received his A.B. degree in psychology and chemistry at Dartmouth College, and his MD/PhD at Yale School of Medicine under the supervision of Susan Hockfield, graduating Alpha Omega Alpha. He trained at UCLA, where he served an internship in internal medicine, a residency in neurology, and a fellowship in neurogenetics, becoming board-certified in neurology in 1996.

== Career ==
Geschwind joined the faculty of the David Geffen School of Medicine at UCLA in 1997. He holds the Gordon and Virginia MacDonald Distinguished Professorship in Human Genetics, Neurology and Psychiatry, and directs the UCLA Neurogenetics Program and the Center for Autism Research and Treatment.

In March 2016 he was named Senior Associate Dean and Associate Vice Chancellor for Precision Health, a role in which he leads the UCLA Institute for Precision Health and oversees the university's campus-wide precision health initiatives.

He has trained over 70 graduate students and post-doctoral research fellows, and is among the highest cited scientists in neurology, neuroscience, systems biology, and precision health (H index > 200 as of 2026). He has been named in Clarivate Analytics' Highly Cited Researchers list each year since 2017 and has been elected as member of the National Academy of Medicine and the Association of American Physicians.

== Research ==
The Geschwind Lab at the UCLA David Geffen School of Medicine conducts research into three areas: autism and neurodevelopmental disorders, neurodegenerative syndromes, and human brain evolution.

Through functional genomics and large-scale data analyses that permit a more unbiased understanding of disease mechanisms, his laboratory's research contributed to the understanding of human brain evolution and language, ASD and schizophrenia, repair of the damaged nervous system, and neurodegenerative dementias including frontotemporal dementia, progressive supranuclear palsy and Alzheimer's disease.

Geschwind developed and led the Autism Genetic Resource Exchange (AGRE) with the Cure Autism Now Foundation in 1997. AGRE was the first major community resource for genetic research on autism spectrum disorder (ASD), making biomaterials and phenotype data accessible to researchers worldwide. This initiative opened the field to many more researchers and led to significant discoveries, including the role of rare mutations and inherited genetic variation in ASD. A longtime advocate for open data, Geschwind has helped lead several national resource-building efforts. Among these is the PsychENCODE consortium, an NIH-funded program that maps gene regulation in the human brain to advance research on psychiatric illness. He was a senior author of the consortium's capstone analyses, including a 2018 study that catalogued transcriptomic dysregulation shared across autism, schizophrenia, and bipolar disorder. Over the last 10 years, he has led efforts with collaborators, including John Constantino and Ami Klin, to increase the representation of groups that have been historically underrepresented in autism research, via an NIH-funded Autism Center of Excellence Network that recruits African Americans with autism.

His work in autism genetics and functional genomics has been highly influential by translating genetic findings into biological understanding. He developed the concept of ASD as a developmental disconnection syndrome, recognizing its extreme heterogeneity and framing it as "the autisms." Geschwind pioneered the study of language and social endophenotypes in genetic studies and demonstrated how transcriptomic and epigenetic profiling could define the molecular pathology of ASD and other neuropsychiatric disorders. In 2011, he was the senior author of a study that identified chemical differences between the brains of people with autism and those without it. Specifically, the study found common patterns in gene expression in the frontal and temporal lobes of autistic individuals. Geschwind has published research on numerous genes involved in language and human brain evolution, such as FOXP2, and how they differ between humans and chimpanzees. Additionally, Geschwind is known for his research into factors affecting handedness and the differences in brain structure between left-handed and right-handed people.

== Personal life ==
His brother, Michael Geschwind, is also a professor of neurology. Norman Geschwind, a pioneer in behavioral neurology, is his father's first cousin. From 1965 to 1982, his father, Stanley Geschwind, served as the head of the Quantum and Solid-State Physics Department at Bell Labs.

== Awards and prizes ==
- 2024 Distinguished Clinical Research Scholar and Educator in Residence, NIH
- 2022 Rhoda and Bernard Sarnat International Prize in Mental Health from the National Academy of Medicine
- 2022 Cotzias Award and Lecture, American Academy of Neurology
- 2021 Gold Medal, Society for Biological Psychiatry
- 2015 Paul G Allen Distinguished Investigator Award
- 2012 Ruane Prize for Outstanding Achievement in Child and Adolescent Psychiatric Research from the Brain & Behavior Research Foundation
- 2011 Elected Member, National Academy of Medicine
- 2008 Scientific Service Award from Autism Speaks
- 2006 NIH MERIT Award
- 2004 Derek Denny-Brown Neurological Scholar Award from the American Neurological Association

== Selected publications ==
- Abrahams, Brett S.; Geschwind, Daniel H. (2008). "Advances in autism genetics: on the threshold of a new neurobiology". Nature Reviews Genetics. 9 (5): 341–355. doi:10.1038/nrg2346. PMC 2756414. PMID 18414403.
- Geschwind, Daniel H.; Levitt, Pat (2007). "Autism spectrum disorders: developmental disconnection syndromes". Current Opinion in Neurobiology. 17 (1): 103–111. doi:10.1016/j.conb.2007.01.009. PMID 17275283.
- Oldham, Michael C.; Konopka, Genevieve; et al. (2008). "Functional organization of the transcriptome in human brain". Nature Neuroscience. 11 (11): 1271–1282. doi:10.1038/nn.2207. PMC 2756411. PMID 18849986.
- Voineagu, Irina; et al. (2011). "Transcriptomic analysis of autistic brain reveals convergent molecular pathology". Nature. 474 (7351): 380–384. doi:10.1038/nature10110. PMC 3607626. PMID 21614001.
- Parikshak, Neelroop N.; et al. (2016). "Genome-wide changes in lncRNA, splicing, and regional gene expression patterns in autism". Nature. 540 (7633): 423–427. doi:10.1038/nature20612. PMC 7102905. PMID 27919067.
- Gandal, Michael J.; Geschwind, Daniel H.; et al. (2018). "Transcriptome-wide isoform-level dysregulation in ASD, schizophrenia, and bipolar disorder". Science. 362 (6420) eaat8127. doi:10.1126/science.aat8127. PMC 6443102. PMID 30545856.
