= Albert Galaburda =

Chilean-born American neurologist (born 1948)

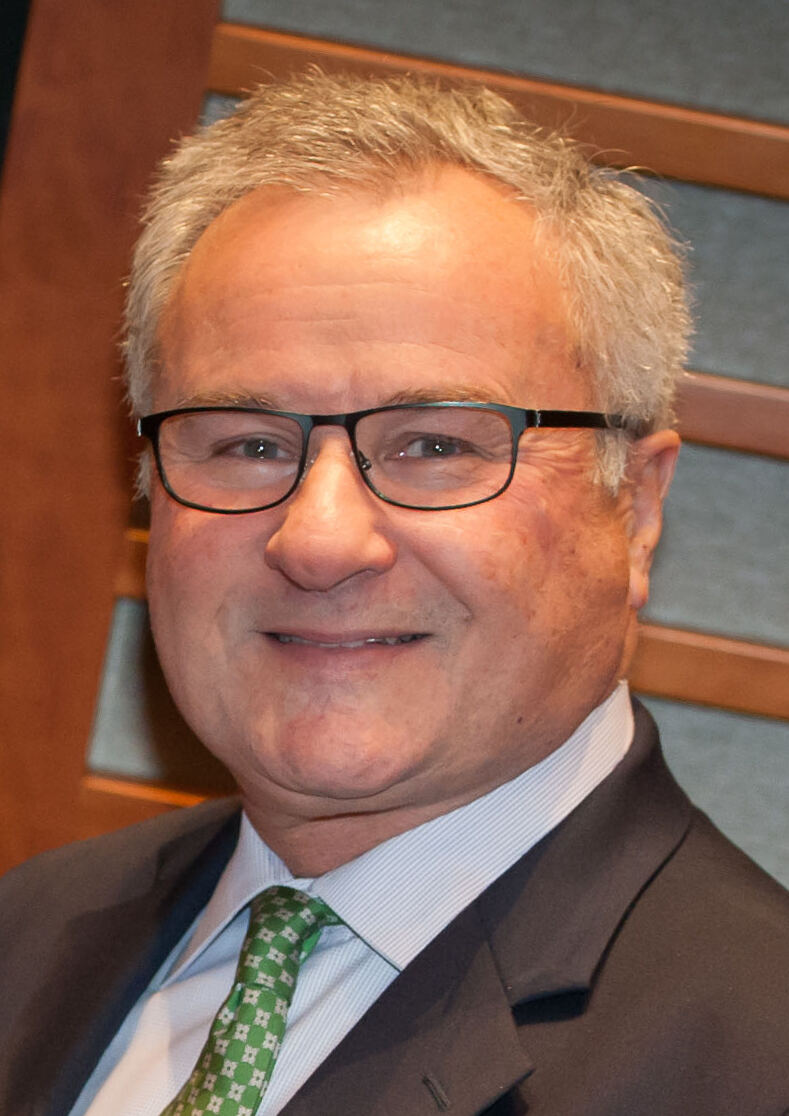
- Galaburda in 2017
- Born: Albert Mark Galaburda; July 20, 1948 (age 78); Santiago, Chile
- Education: Boston University School of Medicine (AB, MD, 1971)
- Known for: Neuroanatomy of dyslexia Geschwind–Galaburda hypothesis
- Awards: Neuronal Plasticity Prize, IPSEN Foundation (2001); Harold Amos Faculty Diversity Award (2011); Lifetime Achievement Award in Behavioral Neurology (2016)
- Scientific career
- Fields: Behavioral neurology, cognitive neuroscience, neuroanatomy
- Workplaces: Harvard Medical School; Beth Israel Deaconess Medical Center
- Academic advisors: Norman Geschwind

Albert Mark Galaburda (born July 20, 1948) is a Chilean-born American cognitive and behavioral neurologist. He is the Emily Fisher Landau Professor of Neurology and Neuroscience, emeritus, at Harvard Medical School and Beth Israel Deaconess Medical Center (BIDMC). He is known for providing some of the first neuroanatomical evidence of structural differences in the brains of people with dyslexia and, with Norman Geschwind, for proposing the Geschwind–Galaburda hypothesis of cerebral lateralization.

== Early life and education ==
Galaburda was born in Santiago, Chile, on July 20, 1948, and immigrated to the United States at age 14. He attended Beacon High School in Beacon, New York, graduating in 1965, and then entered the Six-Year Liberal Arts–Medicine Program at Boston University School of Medicine, receiving an AB (cum laude) and an MD in 1971.

He trained at Boston City Hospital (now Boston Medical Center), first as an intern and resident in internal medicine (1971–1973), where his mentors included Norman Levinsky, and then as a resident and clinical fellow in neurology (1973–1976) under Norman Geschwind. He was board certified in internal medicine in 1976 and in neurology in 1977. Harvard University awarded him an honorary Master of Arts degree in 1994.

== Career ==
Galaburda joined the neurology faculty of Harvard Medical School in 1976, rising from instructor to full professor in 1994. In 1995 he became the first incumbent of the Emily Fisher Landau Professorship of Neurology and Neuroscience. At Beth Israel Deaconess Medical Center he directed the Dyslexia Research Laboratory (1982–1993) and served from 1993 to 2015 as chief of the Division of Behavioral Neurology, later renamed the Division of Cognitive Neurology.

With psychologist Alfonso Caramazza, Galaburda co-directed Harvard University's Mind Brain Behavior Interfaculty Initiative. His research was supported by continuous funding from the National Institutes of Health from 1979 to 2015, during which he published more than 300 research and review articles and wrote or edited several books. Since 1997 he has also held an external faculty appointment at the Instituto de Ciencias Biomédicas of the University of Chile in Santiago.

Galaburda served as senior editor of Neuropsychologia (1990–1998) and on the editorial boards of journals including Cognition, Dyslexia, the Journal of Learning Disabilities, Reading and Writing, and NeuroImage. He was a longtime advisor to the Orton Dyslexia Society (now the International Dyslexia Association) and served on National Institutes of Health scientific panels on language disorders.

== Research ==
=== Neuroanatomy of dyslexia ===
In 1979, Galaburda and neuropathologist Thomas Kemper reported one of the first postmortem studies of the brain of a person with dyslexia, finding clusters of misplaced neurons (ectopias) resulting from abnormal neuronal migration during fetal development, together with unusual symmetry of the planum temporale, a language-related region that is asymmetric in most brains. These findings, later extended to additional brains, helped establish dyslexia as a condition with a neurobiological basis.

=== Geschwind–Galaburda hypothesis ===
With Norman Geschwind, Galaburda proposed what became known as the Geschwind–Galaburda hypothesis, published as a three-part article in Archives of Neurology in 1985 and expanded into the 1987 book Cerebral Lateralization. The hypothesis links prenatal testosterone exposure to patterns of cerebral lateralization, and through them to left-handedness, immune disorders, and developmental cognitive conditions including dyslexia. The hypothesis was influential in launching research on the biological origins of learning differences, but subsequent reviews found limited empirical support for several of its core claims.

=== Animal models and genetics ===
In later work, Galaburda and collaborators including Gordon Sherman, Glenn Rosen, R. Holly Fitch, and Joseph LoTurco developed rat and mouse models of the neuronal migration anomalies seen in dyslexic brains, using cortical manipulation and, later, RNA interference and gene knockouts targeting candidate dyslexia-susceptibility genes such as DYX1C1. This work linked these genes to pathways governing neuronal migration and to deficits in processing rapidly changing sounds, with stronger effects in males, paralleling the higher reported prevalence of dyslexia in boys. Based on this research, Galaburda has argued that dyslexia begins as a sensory deficit in auditory perception rather than as a primary language disorder.

In 1995, Galaburda and neurobiologist Margaret Livingstone were issued a United States patent for a method of detecting magnocellular visual pathway defects associated with dyslexia.

=== Other research ===
Galaburda studied the anatomical organization of the auditory cortex in rhesus monkeys with Deepak Pandya and in humans with Friedrich Sanides. With Ursula Bellugi, Allan Reiss, Debra Mills, and Julie Korenberg, he investigated the neurobiology and genetics of Williams syndrome, and he served on the medical advisory board of the Williams Syndrome Association.

== Diversity and mentorship ==
Galaburda founded and directed BIDMC's Office for Diversity, Inclusion, and Career Advancement. In 2011 he received Harvard Medical School's Harold Amos Faculty Diversity Award for creating a diverse environment within the hospital's Cognitive Neurology Unit.

== Awards and honors ==
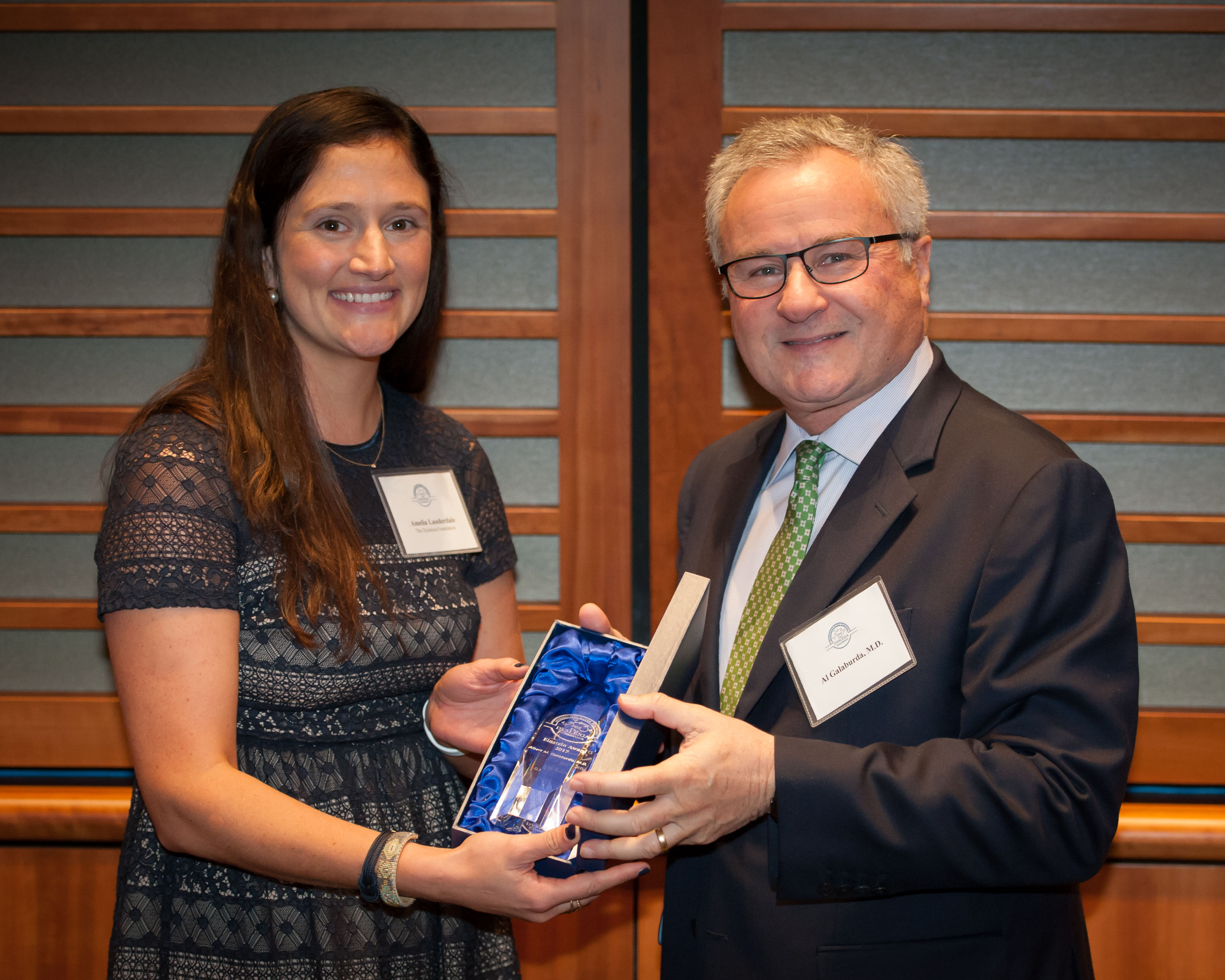
Amelia Baker Lauderdale presents Galaburda with The Dyslexia Foundation's Einstein Award in 2017.

- Research Award, Orton Dyslexia Society (1980)
- Pattison Prize in Neuroscience (1983)
- Elected member, American Neurological Association (1985)
- Scientist of the Year, Association for Children with Learning Disabilities (1987)
- Norman Geschwind Memorial Lecture, Orton Dyslexia Society (1989)
- Fellow, Royal Society of Medicine (1992)
- Honorary MA, Harvard University (1994)
- Invited speaker, Decade of the Brain series, American Academy of Neurology (1994)
- Fellow, American Academy of Neurology (1996)
- Neuronal Plasticity Prize, IPSEN Foundation (2001)
- Harold Amos Faculty Diversity Award, Harvard Medical School (2011)
- Lifetime Achievement Award in Behavioral Neurology, Society of Behavioral and Cognitive Neurology (2016)
- Einstein Award, The Dyslexia Foundation (2017)

The Dyslexia Foundation's Albert M. Galaburda Research Award, supporting early-career dyslexia researchers, is named in his honor.

== Selected works ==
- Ansara, A.; Geschwind, N.; Galaburda, A. M.; et al., eds. (1981). Sex Differences in Dyslexia. Towson, MD: The Orton Dyslexia Society.
- Geschwind, N.; Galaburda, A. M., eds. (1984). Cerebral Dominance: The Biological Foundations. Cambridge, MA: Harvard University Press.
- Geschwind, N.; Galaburda, A. M. (1987). Cerebral Lateralization: Biological Mechanisms, Associations, and Pathology. Cambridge, MA: MIT Press.
- Galaburda, A. M., ed. (1989). From Reading to Neurons. Cambridge, MA: MIT Press.
- Galaburda, A. M., ed. (1993). Dyslexia and Development: Neurobiological Aspects of Extra-Ordinary Brains. Cambridge, MA: Harvard University Press.
- Galaburda, A. M.; Kosslyn, S. M.; Christen, Y., eds. (2002). The Languages of the Brain. Cambridge, MA: Harvard University Press.
- Galaburda, A. M.; Gaab, N.; Hoeft, F.; McCardle, P., eds. (2017). Dyslexia and Neuroscience: The Geschwind–Galaburda Hypothesis 30 Years Later. Baltimore, MD: Paul H. Brookes Publishing.
