= Edith Kaplan =

American psychologist

Edith F. Kaplan (February 16, 1924 – September 3, 2009) was an American psychologist, and a pioneer of neuropsychological tests who did most of her work at the Boston VA Hospital. Kaplan is known for her promotion of clinical neuropsychology as a specialty area in psychology. She examined brain-behavioral relationships in aphasia, apraxia, developmental issues in clinical neuropsychology, as well as normal and abnormal aging. Kaplan helped develop a new method of assessing brain function with neuropsychological assessment, called "The Boston Process Approach."

As a graduate student, Kaplan worked with Heinz Werner, and then collaborated further with Norman Geschwind as well as Harold Goodglass.

== Personal history ==
Kaplan was born in Brooklyn, New York. She earned her bachelor's degree at Brooklyn College, then did her graduate work at Clark University in Worcester, with a dissertation focusing on the development of word meanings and apraxia in children.

Kaplan was a professor in the departments of Neurology and Psychiatry, and in the Behavioral Neuroscience Ph.D. Program at Boston University School of Medicine at the time of her death. Kaplan was a professor of psychology at Suffolk University and Affiliate Professor of Psychology at Clark University. She was also a member of the Psychology Department at the Baycrest Hospital in Toronto, Ontario, Canada.

== Mentorship ==
Kaplan was a leader in developing education and training of neuropsychologists. From 1976 to 1987, Kaplan was the director of Clinical Neuropsychological Services at the Boston Veterans Administration Medical Center where she was responsible for the development of pre- and post-doctoral clinical neuropsychological internship training program. Later, at Suffolk University, Boston University School of Medicine, and Tewksbury Hospital, she continued this work. She also did philanthropic work with the National Head Injury Foundation and the World Health Organization.

== Clinical contributions ==
Kaplan made important contributions to clinical neuropsychological assessment. Her observations and assessment methods evolved into a philosophical school of neuropsychological assessment, called by most people the "Boston Process Approach."

Kaplan also re-purposed intelligence tests such as the Wechsler Adult Intelligence Scale as tools to localize functional deficits in the brain (whether developmental or due to lesions).

Prior to the introduction of the process-oriented approach, clinical neuropsychological assessment followed a fixed-battery global-achievement approach, and stressed quantitative interpretation of test results (for example, the Halstead-Reitan battery). The process-oriented approach offered advances in test interpretation, stressing the qualitative aspects of patients' performance profiles. The Boston Process Approach examines the qualitative process by which the patient solves a problem rather than simply looking at the patient's quantitative numerical scores. The Boston Process also tailors which tests to give a patient instead of administering an entire test battery to every subject, regardless of their condition. This alternative approach improved clinical understanding of brain functions and generated discussion about diagnostic issues in clinical neuropsychology.

Kaplan developed and co-authored The Boston Diagnostic Aphasia Examination, The Boston Naming Test, The Boston Stimulus Board, The California Verbal Learning Test (Adult and Children's Versions), Microcog: A Computerized Assessment of Cognitive Status, the Wechsler Adult Intelligence Scale - Revised, as a Neuropsychological Instrument (WAIS-R-NI), the Wechsler Intelligence Scale for Children - III, as a Neuropsychological Instrument (WISC-III-NI), The Baycrest Assessment of Neuropsychological Status, and The Delis-Kaplan Executive Function System (D-KEFS), a refined and expanded selection of tasks from the widely used Halstead-Reitan battery. She also contributed analytical methods for clock drawings as neuropsychological assessment tools, especially regarding spatial neglect and attention.

Kaplan also contributed a body of research, including (with Norman Geschwind) the first paper on cerebral disconnection syndrome. She also investigated Parkinson's disease, schizophrenia, dementia, and other neuropsychological disorders.

== Professional Achievements and Awards ==
- Distinguished Service Award, Massachusetts Speech and Hearing Association (1977)
- Recognized by National Head Injury Foundation (1982)
- Recognized by National Head Injury Foundation (1982)
- Ezra Paul Psychological Service Award, Massachusetts Psychological Association (1984)
- Distinguished Clinical Neuropsychologist Award, National Academy of Neuropsychology (1993)
- Distinguished Contributions Award, New England Psychological Association (1996)
- Distinguished Career Contributions Award, Massachusetts Psychological Association (1997)
- Inducted into the Psi Chi Honor Society, St. Anselm College, Manchester, New Hampshire (1997)

== Selected publications ==
- Armengol, C., Kaplan, E., & Moes, E. (Eds.). (2001). The consumer oriented neuropsychological report. Odessa, FL: Psychological Assessment Resources.
- Kaplan, E. (2002). Serendipity in science: A personal account. In T. Stringer, E. Cooley, & A.L. Christensen (Eds.) Pathways to prominence in neuropsychology: Reflections of twentieth century pioneers. New York: Psychology Press.
