= Delis–Kaplan Executive Function System =

Neuropsychological test

- Synonyms: D-KEFS
- Purpose: measure a variety of verbal and nonverbal executive functions

The Delis–Kaplan Executive Function System (D-KEFS) is a neuropsychological test used to measure a variety of verbal and nonverbal executive functions for both children and adults (ages 8–89 years). This assessment was developed over the span of a decade by Dean Delis, Edith Kaplan, and Joel Kramer, and it was published in 2001. The D-KEFS comprises nine tests that were designed to stand alone. Therefore, there are no aggregate measures or composite scores for an examinee's performance. A vast majority of these tests are modified, pre-existing measures (e.g., the Trail Making Test); however, some of these measures are new indices of executive functions (e.g., Word Context Test).

== Nine tests ==
This measure consists of the following subtests:

- The Trail Making Test measures flexibility of thinking on a visual-motor sequencing task
- The Verbal Fluency Test measures letter fluency, category fluency, and category switching
- The Design Fluency Test measures one's initiation of problem-solving behavior, fluency in generating visual patterns, creativity in drawing new designs, simultaneous processing in drawing the designs while observing the rules and restrictions of the task, and inhibiting previously drawn responses
- The Color-Word Interference Test measures ability to inhibit a dominant and automatic verbal response
- The Sorting Test measures concept-formation skills, modality-specific problem-solving skills (verbal/nonverbal), and the ability to explain sorting concepts abstractly
- The Twenty Questions Test measures the ability to categorize, formulate abstract, yes/no questions, and incorporate the examiner's feedback to formulate more efficient yes/no questions
- The Word Context Test measures verbal modality, deductive reasoning, integration of multiple bits of information, hypothesis testing, and flexibility of thinking
- The Tower Test measures spatial planning, rule learning, inhibition of impulsive and perseverative responding, and the ability to establish and maintain instructional set
- The Proverb Test measures one's ability to form novel, verbal abstractions

These 9 subtests generate 16 main achievement scores and hundreds of optional error, contrast, accuracy, and time-interval scores. As such, use of the computerized scoring assistant (available for purchase from the test publisher) makes scoring the measure less time consuming.

This assessment was normed with a representative sample. The D-KEFS has been criticized because only 17% of the reliability values published in the D-KEFS manual are above a 0.80 value. However, this may not pose serious concern due to the challenges of measuring executive functions. The D-KEFS offers a comprehensive portrayal of individual's EF skills, and the complexity of these tasks make them sensitive to the detection of even mild brain damage.

In 2009, an abbreviated form of the D-KEFS was included in the Advanced Clinical Solutions (ACS) for the WAIS-IV and WMS-IV (published by Pearson/PsychCorp). This abbreviated form of the D-KEFS consists of two subtests: the Trail Making test and the Verbal Fluency test. Using the ACS software, examiners can compare performance on these two subtests with performance on the WAIS-IV and WMS-IV, which allows for a more integrated assessment of functioning.

In 2011, Crawford et al. made available free computer software that allows the assessor to calculate important supplementary values. These values help identify whether the assessee's overall pattern of performance on the D-KEFS deviates markedly from the normal population (as generated using the Monte Carlo statistical method). Further, these values aid the assessor in identifying spuriously low scores that are due to inflated type one error rates when multiple scores are generated within the same tool.

== In clinical settings ==
The D-KEFS was designed to be used in clinical settings for a variety of populations. Specifically, it assesses mild brain damage in the frontal lobes. The D-KEFS also helps determine how deficits in higher order thinking may impact an individual's functioning. In turn, one's performance can be used to develop coping strategies and rehabilitation programs tailored towards individual's profile of strengths and weaknesses in executive functions. D-KEFS is designed to be used in school settings by school psychologists, specifically it can be used as an important tool that complements traditional tests of intelligence and other basic achievement skills. This assessment has been utilized for a number of different clinical populations including those with: frontal-lobe lesions, attention deficit hyperactivity disorder, specific learning disabilities, mood disorders (e.g., bipolar disorder), autism spectrum disorders, traumatic brain injury, fetal alcohol syndrome, neuroinflammatory disorders (e.g., multiple sclerosis) and spina bifida.
