= Harold Goodglass =

Harold Goodglass (August 18, 1920 – March 18, 2002) was a prominent pioneer of neuropsychological tests and assessment, and spent much of his career investigating aphasia. The Boston VA Hospital, where he spent many years investigating brain function, now houses the Harold Goodglass Aphasia Research Center.

Goodglass was born in New York City August 18, 1920, graduated from Townsend Harris High School in 1935, and received a B.A. degree from City College of New York in 1939. He served in the Army Air Force from 1942 to 1946, and was discharged as a Captain. He then attended New York University, receiving a M.A. degree in psychology in 1948, and he received a Ph.D. degree in clinical psychology from the University of Cincinnati in 1951.

Goodglass developed a special interest in aphasia early in his career, and with the research support of the Department of Veterans Affairs (VA) and the National Institutes of Health (NIH), he published research articles on disorders of naming in aphasia, on category specific disorders of lexical comprehension and production, on the comprehension of syntax, and on the syndrome of agrammatism. He also carried out a program of studies on cerebral dominance. Among his collaborators were Fred Quadfasel, Jean Berko Gleason, Edith Kaplan, Martin Albert, Nancy Helm-Estabrooks, Marlene Oscar Berman, Sheila Blumstein, Nelson Butters, Norman Geschwind, Howard Gardner, Edgar Zurif, Joan Borod, Arthur Wingfield, and Kim Lindfield.

Goodglass became director of the Boston University Aphasia Research Center in 1969, which is located at the VA Medical Center in Jamaica Plain. He remained in that post until 1996, and the Center was renamed in his honor, the "Harold Goodglass Aphasia Research Center." He was the author of over 130 research articles, and of the books Psycholinguistics and Aphasia (with Sheila Blumstein), The Assessment of Aphasia and Related Disorders, the Boston Diagnostic Aphasia Examination (with Edith Kaplan), Understanding Aphasia, and Anomia (with Arthur Wingfield). He received the 1997 Gold Medal Award for Contributions to the Application of Psychology from the American Psychological Foundation. He had recently been awarded a five-year grant from National Institutes of Health to continue his studies of aphasia.

Goodglass died on March 18, 2002, of complications of a fall. He was 82.
