= VA Boston Healthcare System =

Hospital network in Massachusetts, United States

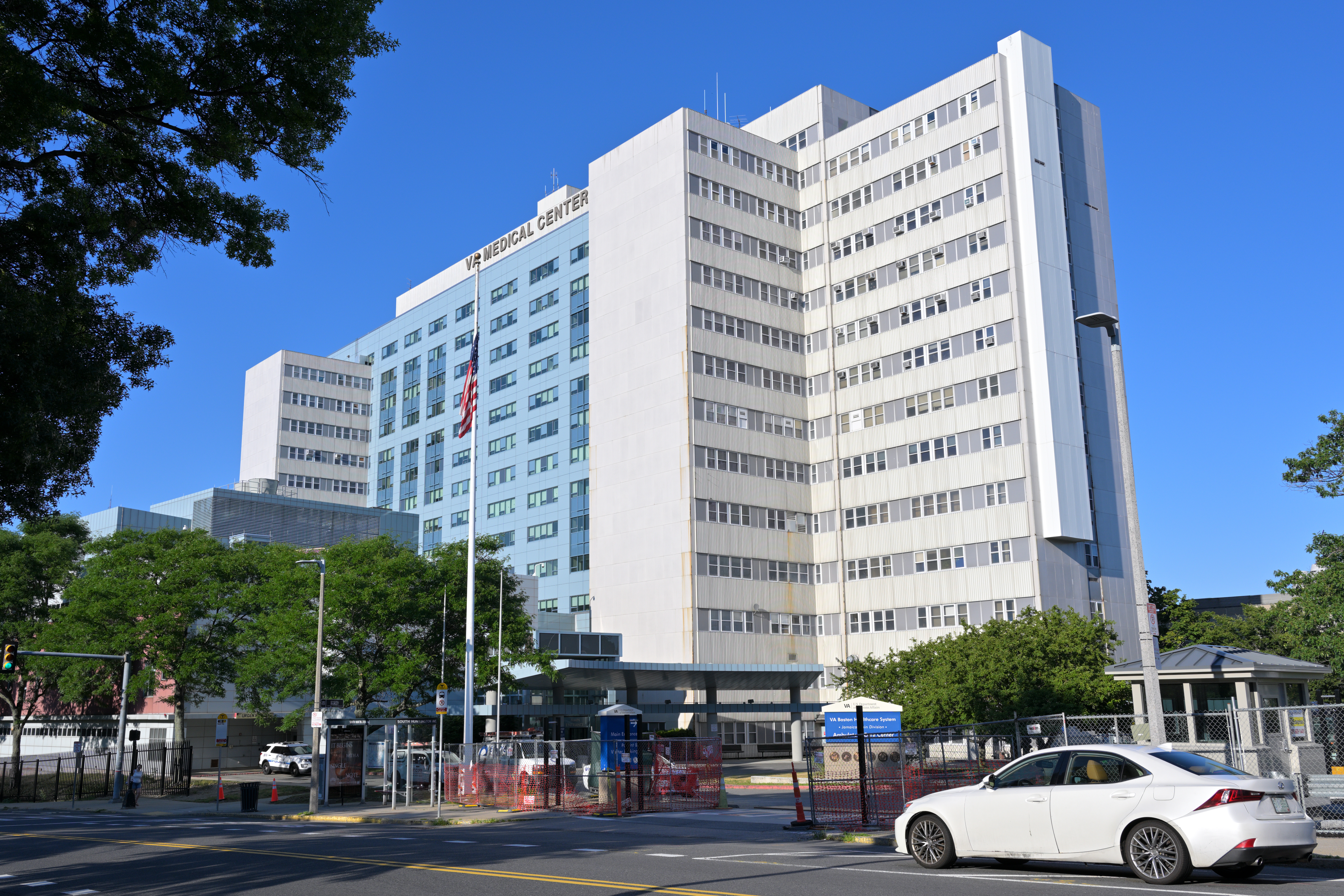
The Jamaica Plain campus

The VA Boston Healthcare System is a set of hospitals run by the United States Department of Veterans Affairs in the Greater Boston area. It comprises nine campuses, with three major medical centers in Jamaica Plain, West Roxbury, and Brockton.

The Jamaica Plain building was the site of a great deal of research in neuropsychology. Edith Kaplan, Norman Geschwind and Harold Goodglass developed many neuropsychological tests here to describe and treat aphasia along with other psychological problems. After it was retired as an inpatient facility, many of the rooms were converted into offices that now support researchers from Harvard and Boston University.

Current research activities include the Massachusetts Veterans Epidemiology Research and Information Center (MAVERIC), the Behavioral Science Division of the National Center for PTSD, the Women's Health Sciences Division of the National Center for PTSD, and a Geriatric Research Education and Clinical Center GRECC.
