= Michael Geschwind =

Michael D. Geschwind
- Education: Albert Einstein College of Medicine (M.D., Ph.D.) UCLA Medical Center (internship); Johns Hopkins School of Medicine (residency) UCSF Memory and Aging Center (fellowship)
- Occupation: Professor of Neurology
- Medical career
- Profession: Professor
- Field: Neurology
- Institutions: UCSF Memory and Aging Center
- Research: Neurodegenerative disorders

Michael D. Geschwind is a professor of neurology at the UCSF Memory and Aging Center (MAC), specializing in neurodegenerative disorders.

Geschwind has published highly cited papers on rapidly progressive dementias, prion diseases (including Creutzfeldt–Jakob disease and Gerstmann–Sträussler–Scheinker syndrome), Alzheimer disease, and limbic and autoimmune encephalitis. He has served as the principal investigator on studies on human prion disease and Creutzfeldt–Jakob disease. He was guest editor for the American Academy of Neurology (AAN) Continuum Dementia edition, and was on the AAN committee for dementia criteria. He has also published highly cited papers on cognitive dysfunction in movement disorders, and serves as the director of the MAC Huntington's Disease center.

== Biography ==
Like his brother Daniel Geschwind, Michael was inspired to study neurology by the work of Norman Geschwind, his father's cousin. He majored in neurobiology in college, and obtained an M.D. and Ph.D. in neuroscience from Albert Einstein College of Medicine, and went on to complete his internship at UCLA Medical Center, his residency at Johns Hopkins School of Medicine, and his fellowship at UCSF MAC. He currently holds the Michael J. Homer Chair in Neurology at UCSF MAC.

He serves on the board of directors of the San Francisco Bay Area chapter of Physicians for Social Responsibility.
