= PsychENCODE Consortium =

Psychiatric research group

The PsychENCODE Consortium was founded by the U.S. National Institutes of Health in 2015 to study the role of rare genetic variants involved in several psychiatric disorders. PsychENCODE aims to create a public resource of genomic data gathered from 1,000 healthy and disease-affected post-mortem brains reflecting different developmental periods.

PsychENCODE will first focus on autism spectrum disorder, bipolar disorder, and schizophrenia, and then move on to other disorders.

== Organizations ==
As of December 2018, participating organizations include:

- Duke University
- Icahn School of Medicine at Mount Sinai
- Johns Hopkins University
- Lieber Institute for Brain Development
- Mayo Clinic
- National Institute of Mental Health
- Sage Bionetworks
- SUNY Downstate Medical University
- SUNY Upstate Medical University
- University of California Los Angeles
- University of Chicago
- University of Illinois
- University of Massachusetts Medical School
- University of North Carolina
- University of Southern California
- Yale University
