= Jerre Levy =

American psychologist

Jerre Levy (born April 7, 1938) is an American psychologist and researcher of the brain. She has studied the relationship between the cerebral hemispheres and visual-oriented versus language-oriented tasks in split-brain surgery patients.

Jerre Levy was born in Birmingham, Alabama on April 7, 1938. She earned a degree in psychology from the University of Miami in 1962. She attended graduate school there for a year and a half before transferring to Caltech, where she worked in Roger Sperry's laboratory. She received her PhD in 1970. From 1972 to 1977 Levy taught at the University of Pennsylvania. She then became a professor at the University of Chicago.

She has also found evidence that the left hemisphere specializes in linear reasoning, while the right brain is more involved in holistic reasoning.

She claims that the two hemispheres of the brain work together for every human function rather than act as two separate brains, as Sperry believed.

== Publications ==
- Levy, J., Trevarthen, C., & Sperry, R.W. (1972). "Perception of bilateral chimeric figures following hemispheric deconnexion." Brain, 95(1), 61-78. doi:10.1093/brain/95.1.61
- Levy, J. Cerebral asymmetries as manifested in split-brain man. In M. Kinsbourne & W.L. Smith (eds.), Hemispheric disconnection and cerebral function. Springfield, IL: Charles C. Thomas.
