= Boston Naming Test =

Psychological assessment tool

- Purpose: measure confrontational word retrieval in individuals with aphasia

The Boston Naming Test (BNT), introduced in 1983 by Edith Kaplan, Harold Goodglass and Sandra Weintraub, is a widely used neuropsychological assessment tool to measure confrontational word retrieval in individuals with aphasia or other language disturbance caused by stroke, Alzheimer's disease, or other dementing disorder. A common and debilitating feature is anomic aphasia, an impairment in the ability to name objects. The BNT contains 60 line drawings graded in difficulty. Patients with anomia often have greater difficulties with the naming of not only difficult and low frequency objects but also easy and high frequency objects. Naming difficulties may be rank ordered along a continuum. Items are rank ordered in terms of their ability to be named, which is correlated with their frequency. This type of picture-naming test is also useful in the examination of children with learning disabilities and the evaluation of brain-injured adults.

== Instructions for administration ==
The 60-item BNT is widely used, while there are shorter versions of the test to suit the needs of the particular assessment. For most adults, the examiner begins with Item 30 and continues through Item 60, unless certain discontinue criteria--or reverse-order administration criteria--are met. The patient is shown target stimuli and asked to identify each target item within a 20-second interval per trial. The examiner writes down the patient’s responses in the Response Booklet. If the patient fails to give the correct response initially, the examiner provides a phonemic cue, which is the initial sound of the target word (e.g., "moo" for "moose"). A stimulus cue is provided if the patient blatantly misconstrues the image (i.e., viewing a musical instrument as a building). Additional administration criteria are provided in the Test Manual. After the patient completes the test, the examiner scores each item + or – according to the response coding and scoring procedures.

== Brain areas associated with naming ==
Research has found that several specific brain regions that showed greater gray and white matter volume and integrity were associated with better task performance on the BNT. The classically known language areas are Broca’s and Wernicke’s areas in the frontal and temporal lobes, respectively, of the left hemisphere (for most people). Additional areas that are activated for language processes are outside those areas in the left hemisphere—especially anterior to Broca’s area- as well as in right hemisphere regions. Naming tasks seem to be associated with the left triangularis in the frontal lobe and superior temporal-lobe regions (including the planum temporale). Whereas Broca’s and Wernicke’s areas in the left hemisphere are mainly responsible for language production and comprehension, respectively, the right hemisphere regions are known to play a different role in language processing including discourse planning, comprehension, understanding humor, sarcasm, metaphors and indirect requests, and the generation/comprehension of emotional prosody.
