= Norman Geschwind =

American behavioral neurologist (1926–1984)

- Born: January 8, 1926; New York City, U.S.
- Died: November 4, 1984 (aged 58); Boston, Massachusetts, U.S.
- Education: Harvard Medical School
- Known for: Behavioral neurology
- Scientific career
- Fields: Neurology
- Workplaces: Boston City Hospital
- Academic advisors: Derek Denny-Brown
- Notable students: Antonio Damasio

Norman Geschwind (January 8, 1926 – November 4, 1984) was a pioneering American behavioral neurologist.

== Early life ==
Norman Geschwind was born on January 8, 1926, in New York City, to a Jewish family. He was a student at Boy's High School in Brooklyn, New York City. He matriculated into Harvard University in 1942, initially planning to study mathematics. His education was interrupted when drafted into the Army in 1944. After serving for two years, he returned to Harvard University in 1946. Geschwind changed to the Department of Social Relations and studied a combination of social/personality psychology and cultural anthropology. Geschwind later married and had three children, Naomi, David, and Claudia.

== Medical education and training ==
Geschwind attended Harvard Medical School, intending to become a psychiatrist. His emphasis began to shift after studying neuroanatomy with Marcus Singer, at which time he began to develop an interest in aphasia and epilepsy. He graduated medical school in 1951. Geschwind continued his studies at London's National Hospital for Neurology and Neurosurgery, as a Moseley Travelling Fellow from 1952 to 1953, then as a United States Public Health Service fellow from 1953 to 1955. He studied with Sir Charles Symonds who taught the importance of neurologic mechanisms to studying disorders.

In 1955, Geschwind became neurology chief resident at the Boston City Hospital and served under Derek Denny-Brown. From 1956 to 1958 he was a research fellow studying muscle disease at the MIT Department of Biology.

Geschwind joined the Neurology Department of the Boston Veterans Administration Hospital in 1958, where he met Fred Quadfasel, chief of neurology for the department. At this time, his clinical interest in aphasia developed into his lifelong study of the neurological basis of language and higher cognitive functions. Quadfasel encouraged Geschwind to study classic texts of neurology from the 19th and early 20th century, exposing him to classic localizationist theory.

== Career ==
Geschwind became Chief of Neurology at the Boston VA Hospital in 1962, and an associate professor in neurology at Boston University. Geschwind with Edith Kaplan established in the early 1960s at the Boston VA the Boston University Aphasia Research Center. The Aphasia Research Center would go on to become a pioneer in interdisciplinary aphasia research, including luminaries like Harold Goodglass. Geschwind ended his tenure as chief of neurology at the VA in 1966 and became Chair of the Department of Neurology at Boston University for 1966–68.

In 1969, he was chosen as Harvard Medical School's James Jackson Putnam Professor of Neurology, a position previously held by his old mentor, Derek Denny-Brown. At Harvard he continued to research aphasia and epilepsy, as well as dyslexias, the neuroanatomy of cerebral lateral asymmetries, and other areas of neurological dysfunction. Geschwind was noted for his inspirational teaching of medical students, residents, and fellows. He also supported an interdisciplinary approach to research. He significantly shaped the neurological climate in the US and Europe during his life, an influence which lives on in his students.

Geschwind is credited with coining the term behavioral neurology in the 1970s to describe the corpus of course material in the area of higher cortical functions starting to be presented at American Academy of Neurology meetings. He also credited with the discovery of Geschwind syndrome, which describes an interictal behavior pattern seen in some people with temporal lobe epilepsy.

In later years, Geschwind worked with a number of neurologists to whose future research careers in behavioral neurology he gave significant direction; among these were Albert Galaburda, Kenneth Heilman, Elliott Ross, and David N. Caplan. He actively encouraged and supported interdisciplinary research.

Geschwind would remain at Harvard Medical School until his premature death on November 4, 1984, aged 58.

== Legacy ==
Several of his trainees went on to train other neurologists in behavioral neurology, including Albert Galaburda, D. Frank Benson, Antonio Damasio, Marsel Mesulam, Kenneth Heilman, and Elliott Ross.

The Norman Geschwind Award in Behavioral Neurology is presented through the American Academy of Neurology and the Society for Behavioral and Cognitive Neurology yearly in honor of Geschwind. The Norman Geschwind-Rodin Prize is a Swedish award for research in dyslexia.

Neurological eponyms include Geschwind syndrome and the Geschwind–Galaburda hypothesis.

Geschwind's former trainees and colleagues collaborated on a book in his memory, and two of his nephews, Daniel Geschwind and Michael Geschwind, have become prominent in the field of neurology.

== Bibliography ==
- Sandrone, Stefano (December 2013). "Norman Geschwind (1926-1984)". Journal of Neurology. 260 (12): 3197–8. doi:10.1007/s00415-013-6871-9. PMID 23456024. S2CID 12531308.
- Devinsky, Orrin (August 2009). "Norman Geschwind: influence on his career and comments on his course on the neurology of behavior". Epilepsy & Behavior. 15 (4). United States: 413–6. doi:10.1016/j.yebeh.2009.04.029. PMID 19426828. S2CID 35164540.
- Devinsky, Julie; Schachter Steven (August 2009). "Norman Geschwind's contribution to the understanding of behavioral changes in temporal lobe epilepsy: the February 1974 lecture". Epilepsy & Behavior. 15 (4). United States: 417–24. doi:10.1016/j.yebeh.2009.06.006. PMID 19640791. S2CID 22179745.
- Cubelli, Roberto (April 2005). "The history of neuropsychology according to Norman Geschwind: continuity and discontinuity in the development of science". Cortex. 41 (2). Italy: 271–4. doi:10.1016/s0010-9452(08)70913-4. ISSN 0010-9452. PMID 15714921. S2CID 4489243.
- Absher, J R; Benson D F (May 1993). "Disconnection syndromes: an overview of Geschwind's contributions". Neurology. 43 (5). United States: 862–7. doi:10.1212/wnl.43.5.862. ISSN 0028-3878. PMID 8492937. S2CID 40474423.
- Goodglass, H. (March 1986). "Norman Geschwind (1926-1984)". Cortex. 22 (1). Italy: 7–10. doi:10.1016/s0010-9452(86)80029-6. ISSN 0010-9452. PMID 3519075. S2CID 41755343.
- Schacter, Steven C.; Devinsky, Orrin (January 15, 1997). Behavioral neurology and the legacy of Norman Geschwind (1st ed.). Lippincott Williams & Williams. ISBN 9780397516315.
- Heilman, Kenneth M.; Boller, Francois; Damasio, Antonio. "Founding of the Behavioral Neurological Society". Society for Behavioral and Cognitive Neurology. Archived from the original on September 29, 2007.
- Zhenyao, Hong (June 12, 2000). "Norman Geschwind". FJU Graduate School of Linguistics. Fu Jen Catholic University.
- Goodglass, H. (March 1986). "Norman Geschwind (1926-1984)". Cortex; A Journal Devoted to the Study of the Nervous System and Behavior. 22 (1): 7–10. doi:10.1016/s0010-9452(86)80029-6. PMID 3519075. S2CID 41755343.
- Geschwind, Michael D. (May 29, 2010). "Are you Related to "the Geschwind?"". Neuropsychology Review. 20 (2): 123–125. doi:10.1007/s11065-010-9135-9. PMC 2881317. PMID 20512417.
