= Geschwind–Galaburda hypothesis =

Neurological theory

The Geschwind–Galaburda hypothesis is a neurological theory proposed by Norman Geschwind and Albert Galaburda in 1987. The hypothesis posits there are sex differences in cognitive abilities by relating them to lateralisation of brain function. The maturation rates of cerebral hemispheres differ and are mediated by circuiting testosterone levels, which are substantially influenced during the foetal and post-puberty development stages.

According to the hypothesis, testosterone delays the maturation of the brain, particularly the left hemisphere, resulting in corresponding regions of the right hemisphere and unaffected areas of the left hemisphere developing more rapidly. This leads to reduced verbal skills and an increased risk of developing language disorders, e.g dyslexia, while a rapid development of the right hemisphere and the skills corresponding to it, such as attention and problem-solving.

Focusing on foetal testosterone, the rise in levels hinders the development of the individual’s neurology and immunity, potentially explaining how cerebral lateralisation links to learning disorders, giftedness, and immune deficits. In cases of an underdeveloped or functionally impaired left hemisphere, the neuroanatomical asymmetries may lead to compensatory activity in other areas of the brain.

The field of “neuropsychology of individual differences” is concerned with the understanding the relationship between brain lateralisation and behaviour variation. In their work, Geschwind and Galaburda proposed that in order to explain the differences in cognitive abilities, it is dependent on prenatal exposure to testosterone. This comprehensive theoretical framework links the association between brain development, testosterone levels, and cognitive abilities. The theory gathers a wide range of neuropsychological phenomena and their associations under a single theoretical umbrella.

== Relation to dyslexia ==
Dyslexic individuals have varying degrees of reading, writing, and verbal impairments. The development of dyslexia has been explicitly highlighted in those who have a specific cerebral lateralisation pattern, which have shown difficulties in language processing. Typically, the left hemisphere of the brain is dominant in language processing; however, individuals with dyslexia may have an underdeveloped or functionally impaired left hemisphere, leading to language processing difficulties. In response to this, the right hemisphere and posterior parietal cortex compensate to undertake language processing tasks, resulting in inefficiencies in language processing. This compensatory activity in other areas of the brain may explain the variability in the degree of impairment experienced by dyslexic individuals. Understanding the relationship between cerebral lateralisation and language processing amongst dyslexic individuals could be an effective method of diagnosis and treatment. Further research could design appropriate schemes to enhance the language processing and communication abilities of the individuals.

== Studies ==
The Geschwind–Galaburda hypothesis has garnered empirical support from a number of studies. For instance, Witelson et al. discovered that Einstein’s brain exhibited an atypical pattern of cerebral lateralisation, which supports the hypothesis that brain lateralisation is related to cognitive abilities. In relation to the testosterone influence, an increased glial cell density in the left hemisphere caused an increased prenatal exposure to testosterone, which led to the disruption in the development of cerebral lateralisation. Therefore, the increased cell density in Einstein’s left hemisphere suggests the prenatal testosterone may have influenced his cognitive abilities and delayed language processing.

Another study highlighted how the role of neuroanatomy in an individual leads to developmental dyslexia. Researchers note that while the study of sex differences in dyslexia is still in its early stages, hormonal differences have been shown to cause cerebral asymmetry, which is followed by language and speech difficulties. The regions of the brain that are involved in language processing and phonological awareness, such as the planum temporal and inferior parietal lobule, have been found to differ between individuals with and without dyslexia. Impairments in these brain regions can lead to dyslexia, which is characterised by difficulties in reading and writing.

== Contradictions ==
Although the Geschwind–Galaburda hypothesis has been cited in mainstream media and publication resources as a cause for left-handedness, very little research evidence (if any) has been presented to substantiate the theory. In fact, evidence has emerged suggesting that high prenatal estrogen exposure is just as likely to enhance the gene expression for left-handedness. In a study endorsed by the Centers for Disease Control (CDC), it is suggested that men who were prenatally exposed to diethylstilbestrol (a synthetic estrogen based fertility drug), are more likely to be left-handed than unexposed men. A study by Cornish found no association between sex and handedness, contradicting the expectation that there should be more males and left-handers. While the Geschwind–Galaburda hypothesis suggests that higher levels of testosterone should lead to cerebral lateralisation asymmetries, the theory has not been definitively proven or disproven. Further research is needed to fully understand the complexity of this theory and its implications.

Moreover, the theory has the potential to oversimplify the relationship between brain lateralisation and cognitive abilities. The impacts of brain lateralisation on cognitive abilities are highly complex, and there may be multiple causes that are not fully explained by cerebral lateralisation or circulating testosterone. A more holistic approach may be needed to fully understand the relationship between brain lateralisation and cognitive abilities. The controversial evidence supporting and not supporting the theory suggests that it may not be a reliable explanation for these developments.
