= Donald Stuss =

Canadian neuropsychologist (1941–2019)

- Born: Donald Thomas Stuss; September 26, 1941; Sudbury, Ontario, Canada
- Died: September 3, 2019 (aged 77); Toronto, Ontario, Canada
- Education: University of Ottawa
- Known for: Studies of the Frontal Lobes
- Awards: Gold Key Award American Congress of Rehabilitation Medicine (2014); Donald O. Hebb Distinguished Contribution Award (2016)
- Scientific career
- Fields: Neuropsychology
- Workplaces: University of Ottawa, University of Toronto, Baycrest Centre, Toronto, Ontario Brain Institute
- Doctoral advisor: Terence Picton

Donald Thomas Stuss OC OOnt FRSC FCAHS (September 26, 1941 – September 3, 2019) was a Canadian neuropsychologist who studied the frontal lobes of the human brain. He also directed the Rotman Research Institute at Baycrest from 1989 until 2009 and the Ontario Brain Institute from 2011 until 2016.

== Life ==
Donald Stuss was born on September 26, 1941, in Sudbury, Ontario, and grew up in Kitchener-Waterloo. After graduating from high school, he entered a monastery run by the Basilian Fathers in Mundare, Alberta. After 6 years of study and contemplation, he decided that he was better suited to a more active life and studied philosophy at the University of Ottawa. After several years of teaching he then returned to obtain his doctorate in psychology with Terence Picton at the University of Ottawa. He then did a postdoctoral fellowship at the Aphasia Research Center in the Boston Veteran's Administration Hospital where he worked with Frank Benson, Harold Goodglass, and Edith Kaplan, before returning to the University of Ottawa in 1978. In 1989 he moved to Toronto to direct the new Rotman Research Institute established by Joseph Rotman to investigate the cerebral basis of memory and its disorders.

== Research ==
While in Boston, Stuss worked with D. Frank Benson and other colleagues on an extensive study of the neuropsychological consequences of frontal leucotomy. The results of this investigation were published in a sequence of papers and then summarized in the 1986 book The Frontal Lobes. This study triggered Stuss's lifelong interest in the human frontal lobes. In Boston he also started to work with the neurologist Mick Alexander. Their first study together concerned Capgras delusion, which causes a patient to believe that close family members have been replaced by imposters. Alexander et al. pointed out that this can be caused by a combination of frontal lobe damage (causing problems with familiarity) and right hemisphere dysfunction (causing problems with visual recognition). The collaboration between Stuss and Alexander would continue productively for the next 40 years.

In Ottawa, Stuss became interested in the neuropsychological sequelae of traumatic brain injury. He realized that even though the patients did very well on structured tests, they found it difficult to set appropriate goals, plan real-life behaviour, sustain attention and monitor their own performance (functions often considered the "executive functions"). These patients had great difficulty returning to their work and to their family. One of the characteristic findings was a variability of performance on simple reaction time. This was very similar to what happens to patients with nontraumatic lesions of the prefrontal cortex and its connections. He and his colleagues demonstrated these deficits, and worked on ways to help such patients regain a normal life.

In Toronto, Stuss and his colleagues Mick Alexander, Terence Picton and Tim Shallice set up a test battery of simple reaction-time tests to study disorders of attention in normally aging subjects, patients with frontal lobe damage, and patients with traumatic brain injury. Using accurate measurements of lesion-extent in patients with frontal lobe damage he and his colleagues proposed that the prefrontal cortex does not act as a nonspecific cognitive processor, but that multiple localized regions of the prefrontal cortex each perform specific cognitive processes. Over the years, among the many localized functions of the prefrontal cortex, Stuss came to focus on five:

- Superior medial frontal regions activate or “energize” other cognitive functions
- Left lateral frontal regions are essential to task-setting and planning
- Right lateral frontal regions are involved in monitoring performance
- The Ventromedial prefrontal cortex is involved in emotional processing and behavioural regulation
- Frontopolar regions are critical for metacognitive aspects of human behavior

The metacognitive aspects include

- autonoetic consciousness
- theory of mind
- self-awareness
- humour appreciation

As of February 2020, Donald Stuss's h-index as judged on Web of Science using "stuss d*" and searching all databases was 71.

== Books ==
- Stuss & Benson (1986) The Frontal Lobes
- Stuss, Winocur & Robertson (1999 and 2008) Cognitive neurorehabilitation.
- Stuss & Knight (2002 and 2013) Principles of Frontal Lobe Function.

== Scientific administration ==
Stuss led the Rotman Research Institute in Toronto from 1989 until 2009. He started by recruiting Fergus Craik, Morris Freedman, Morris Moscovitch, and Endel Tulving. Around this nucleus he then assembled a group of cooperative and creative scientists to study the human brain using techniques from psychology, physiology, anatomy and neurology. All scientists at the institute were given salaries but no tenure - they had to maintain their scientific productivity to keep their appointments. Some idea of the research produced during his leadership can be found in the book Mind and the Frontal Lobes published as a festschrift for his retirement in 2009.

Stuss was the founding president and Scientific Director of the Ontario Brain Institute from 2011 until 2016. During this time he set up a productive and collaborative network of research on the brain, conjointly funded by government, industry and academia. The institute has had remarkable success in its data sharing among researchers in different locations and in different disciplines.

== Honours ==
Stuss was elected a fellow of the Royal Society of Canada in 2004 and the Canadian Academy of Health Sciences in 2005. He was made an officer of the Order of Ontario in 2001 and the Order of Canada in 2017. He was appointed "University Professor" at the University of Toronto in 2004, and in 2016 received the award from the Canadian Society for Brain, Behaviour and Cognitive Science named in honour of Canadian neuropsychologist Donald Hebb.

== Personal life ==
Donald Stuss married Kaaren Kummer in 1969 and they had two children: David born in 1973 and Leanne in 1974. Don and Kaaren separated in the early 2000s. For the last decade of his life Stuss lived together with his partner Lourenza Fourie. Stuss was also an avid canoeist.

== See also ==
- Frontal lobe disorder
- Cognitive rehabilitation therapy
