= NeuroFocus =

Neuromarketing research company

- Company type: Subsidiary
- Industry: Neuroscience/Neuromarketing
- Founded: 2005 in Berkeley, California
- Founder: Anantha K. Pradeep, Caroline Winnett, Robert T. Knight, Ram Gurumoorthy
- Fate: Acquired by Nielsen Holdings
- Successor: Nielsen NeuroFocus
- Headquarters: Berkeley, California
- Services: Neuromarketing, Brain-wave research, Consumer research
- Parent: Nielsen Holdings

NeuroFocus was a neuromarketing and neuroscience research company founded in 2005 by a group of academics and engineers from UC Berkeley that focused on applying neuroscience, neurology, and neurological testing to a wide range of fields such as marketing, advertising, consumer research, branding, product development, and entertainment content. In 2011, consumer research and analytics firm Nielsen Holdings acquired full ownership of NeuroFocus as part of the Nielsen's Product Innovation Practice.

NeuroFocus primarily relied on building measures of response that were translated from brain waves collected through electroencephalographic (EEG) sensors that record electrical signals produced by the brain in response to stimuli. Aside from EEG-based full brain measurements, NeuroFocus also makes use of other biometrics such as eye-tracking technology.

== History ==
The initial idea behind the company's founding came from Anantha K. Pradeep's encounter as a management consultant with a client who was concerned about the results of his firm's marketing efforts.

Prior to its full acquisition by Nielsen Holdings, NeuroFocus was founded in 2005 by Anantha K. Pradeep, Caroline Winnett, Robert T. Knight, Ram Gurumoorthy in 2005, with Nobel Prize–winning neuroscientist Eric R. Kandel serving as an adviser to the company. Pradeep and Gurumoorthy were both doctoral graduates from UC Berkeley and Robert T. Knight a professor of Psychology and Neuroscience at UC Berkeley as well as a professor of Neurology and Neurosurgery at UC San Francisco. Co-founder Caroline Winnett, a graduate of Berkeley Haas School of Business served as the CMO (Chief Marketing Officer) of Nielsen NeuroFocus in 2012 and has been serving as the executive director of Berkeley SkyDeck since 2015.

In 2008, Nielsen Holdings bought a minority stake of 30% in NeuroFocus as part of its strategic investment into neuromarketing.

In 2010, NeuroFocus acquired UK-based Neuroco as part of business expansion as NeuroFocus Europe Limited.

In 2011, Nielsen Holdings acquired the remaining portion of NeuroFocus to gain full ownership of the company after the British advertising firm WPP attempted to purchase NeuroFocus. Pradeep remained as the chief executive of the firm.

In 2014, NeuroFocus Europe Limited, the European and UK branch of NeuroFocus was dissolved.
