= SkyDeck =

SkyDeck may refer to:

- Berkeley SkyDeck, a business startup incubator program at the University of California, Berkeley
- SkyDeck Music, an American record label and print publisher
- Skydeck, a tourist attraction at the Willis Tower in Chicago, Illinois
