= Supervisory attentional system =

Proposed model on executive functioning of attentional control

Executive functions are a cognitive apparatus that controls and manages cognitive processes. Norman and Shallice (1980) proposed a model on executive functioning of attentional control that specifies how thought and action schemata become activated or suppressed for routine and non-routine circumstances. Schemas, or scripts, specify an individual's series of actions or thoughts under the influence of environmental conditions. Every stimulus condition turns on the activation of a response or schema. The initiation of appropriate schema under routine, well-learned situations is monitored by contention scheduling which laterally inhibits competing schemas for the control of cognitive apparatus. Under unique, non-routine procedures controls schema activation. The SAS is an executive monitoring system that oversees and controls contention scheduling by influencing schema activation probabilities and allowing for general strategies to be applied to novel problems or situations during automatic attentional processes.

== Basic background ==
=== Executive functions ===
Executive functions are cognitive processes that control other brain activities and are predominantly functioning in the prefrontal areas of the frontal lobe. Executive functions are limited in capacity and accountable for the initiation, consolidation, regulation, and inhibition of cognitive, language, motor and emotional processes. These processes underlie such functions as self-evaluation, planning, problem solving, controlling impulses and attention, and strategic selection or sequencing of behaviour to reach desired goals.

Measuring executive functions is often less accurate than measuring non-executive tasks because of the interconnectedness and multi-determined complexity of the brain. Executive functions are hard to measure independently of all other cognitive functions and are often influenced by non-executive factors. Consequently, understanding the relationship between behaviours and cognitive processes can be difficult.

Many models of executive functions have been proposed, none of which completely dominates over all others in validity and acceptability. The underlying complexity of the brain makes it very difficult to verify which model(s) are most correct. This article is most focused on the executive function of the Supervisory Attentional System and research pertaining to the system.

==== Norman and Shallice model (1986) ====
In 1980/1986, psychologists Donald Norman and Tim Shallice proposed a framework of attentional control of executive functioning. The model uses thought and action schemas which are a series of learned thought and action sequences, like scripts, that specify behaviours during situations. Schemas are activated from perceptual stimuli or from the output of recently activated schemata. For an example, entering your kitchen to find a pile of unclean dishes (input) could initiate a behavioural response to clean (schema). It is postulated that an enormous, finite quantity of thought and action schemata exist and that they range in hierarchy. For instance, high-level schemas represent problem solving while low-level schemas typify actions.

In the Norman-Shallice model, two main processes manage the functioning and control of schemas. Contention scheduling is a lower-level mechanism that regulates schemata processes for familiar, automatic actions as well as some novel situations. Contention scheduling ensures the proper schema is activated and, through inhibition, prevents multiple competing actions from executing simultaneously. Schemas have selection conditions and are initiated if the level of activation reaches threshold. Connected schemata mutually inhibit one another. A schema encountering an increased number of activations will result in easier future access and greater suppression of the activation of those schema connected to it. Several concurrently run schemata, for instance walking and talking, are strengthened by use and take less attentional control. Contention scheduling is fast, automatic, and consistent in activating schema.

The second component of the Norman-Shallice model is the Supervisory Attentional System (SAS). This higher-level mechanism has control over contention scheduling. The SAS monitors conscious, deliberate planning of actions, novel situations that cannot be solved by previously learned schemata and/or when preventing error or habitual responses is critical. In addition to monitoring the activation of an appropriate schema and suppressing inappropriate schemata, the SAS adjusts to solve problems that existing schemata failed to resolve. In other words, it modifies general strategies to solve non-routine problems. If there are no existing schemata related to the issue then under attentional control a new schema may be created, assessed and implemented. The formation of a new schema takes approximately 8–10 seconds. Supervisory Attentional System is slow, voluntary, and uses flexible strategies to solve a variety of difficult problems.

There are two main processing distinctions in attention. Automatic attentional processes do not require conscious control and are triggered in response to familiar, environmental stimuli. This contrasts to controlled attentional processes that require conscious control in order to respond to unique situations.

The SAS is involved in the executive component of working memory to store, control, and process appropriate information. The SAS enables independent behaviour involved in memory, planning, decision making, cognitive estimation, problem solving, dangerous environments, novel situations, error inhibition, error correction, and initiating actions. It also encompasses main components of human attention including selection, divisibility, shift-ability, and sustainability. Selection of attention is the ability to select to a specific task over a more salient stimulus or set of background stimuli. Divisibility is when attention is divided among tasks. The ability to jump attention from one task to the next is known as shift-ability. Maintaining attention on one task for an extended amount of time is referred to as the sustainability of attention. The SAS also accounts for the priming of anticipated tasks. However a reduced activity in the SAS is corresponded to momentary inadequacies of attention resulting in irrelevant behaviour known as a capture error. When the SAS is unsuccessful in suppressing irrelevant schema attention is adversely influenced. Similarly, patients with a dysfunctional SAS show complication in recalling memories for specific events and problems with focusing attention, planning, and initiating actions.

Another error in the supervisory attentional system can lead to more devastating implications. When humans are faced with a threatening situation there is often limited time to generate the fight-or-flight response ideally suited to increase survival. Cognitive paralysis is when an individual fails to respond or 'freezes' during an emergency because of either a temporal or cognitive deficiency. The inhibition of the SAS is the proposed temporal constraint during an emergency. If an appropriate pre-learned schema is retrievable, then a survival response will be initiated. However, if no existing schemata can respond, the result is cognitive paralysis, otherwise exhibiting irrational behaviour. Based on this understanding, one may wrongly speculate that the SAS is unfavourable in dangerous situations. The supervisory attentional system provides individuals with the ability to predict and prepare for situations mentally prior to any possible encounter. Many have argued about the specific roles of the SAS in survival situations; a general understanding is that it functions to increase the chance of survival and that it operates in conjunction with an integrated system.

A 3D animated representation of the left hemisphere of the brain, with the right neocortex removed. Highlighted area represents the left frontal lobe.

The noted probable location of the SAS is in the frontal lobes, more specifically in the prefrontal cortex. This follows in understanding that the frontal lobes provide a framework to reach attainable goals. The dorsolateral region of the frontal lobes is involved in thinking and language, and organizes mental representations of content. The prefrontal cortex accommodates many systems and tasks working independently, dependently, and interacting with the SAS. The SAS functioning depends on multiple specific systems, and structures in the brain. Throughout the 1980s and 1990s, much neuropsychological research was conducted on the frontal lobes and prefrontal cortex (PFC). Over time, the supervisory attentional system was incorporated into research on age, brain injuries, psychological disorders, degenerative diseases, substance abuse and more. The following section is a brief review on research involving the SAS.

== Research on supervisory attentional system ==
=== Frontal lobe focal lesions ===
Patients with damaged frontal lobes exhibit characteristic symptoms of people who have executive dysfunction, for instance impaired retrieval of autobiographical information. Patients with frontal lesions vary broadly in the cognitive deficiencies they exhibit and is tied specifically to the precise modality of the lesion.

Lesions in the left anterior frontal lobe are associated with a difficulty in solving novel problems, with less of a problem solving well-learned tasks. This suggests the SAS is present in the left anterior frontal lobe and is more prevalent than contention scheduling. Some common functions characterized by the SAS are planning, inhibition, and abstraction of logical rules. These processes were measured using specifically designed tasks, the Tower of London (TOL), Hayling test, and Brixton test, respectively, and used for the comparison between patients with frontal lobe lesions and control individuals. Patients with lesions required more moves and made more errors on the TOL, they had difficulty initiating automatic responses and inhibiting dominant responses on the Hayling test, and lacked the ability to discover and apply logical rules. Their responses had an abnormally high incidence of irrational responses. The effect was most significant in patients with left anterior frontal lesions suggesting that the impairment of cognitive functions resulted in a dysfunctional SAS which may be more operable in the left anterior portion of the frontal lobe.

However, contradictory results have been found in a separate study based upon the same three cognitive measures. Patients with frontal lesions showed no significant impairment on the Tower of London, Halying, or Brixton tests, despite being slower on the TOL and Hayling tasks.

These conflicting findings could be the result of the differences in patient selection for the studies. In the first set of results the patients were older and had large portions of their frontal lobes completely removed, whereas in the second set, patients were younger and had smaller areas of damage without tissue removed. Older participants have an increased risk of cognitive aging and declines in prefrontal gray matter. The brain is highly interconnected and rarely structures work completely independently of other areas. It is reasonable to conclude that the Supervisory Attentional System, located in the frontal lobes, works together with processes in other areas of the brain. Thus, patients with portions of their frontal lobes removed will have systems completely blocked from functioning properly. In contrast, patients with dysfunctional intact lesions may provide connections for other components of the system to remain functioning. Additionally, areas of the brain connected to the dysfunctional component may have demonstrated neuronal plasticity to incorporate some of the impaired functions into their own processes.

=== Age ===
Research has examined the influence of age on some specific executive functions that are characteristic of the Supervisory Attentional System. Functions such as planning, inhibition and abstraction of logical rules have been shown to be sensitive to patients with frontal dysfunction.

Researchers have found that the elderly have impairment in executive functions measured using the TOL, Hayling test, and Brixton test. Elderly persons, in comparison to young adults, are generally slower and took more moves to solve problems, made more erroneous responses, and had more difficulty understanding and applying logical rules. Age-related effects were reduced for planning when processing speed was statistically controlled, indicating that some of the age-related effects on executive functioning was due to speed. When statistically controlling processing speed for inhibition and reflection of logical rules, the effects of age were still apparent. These findings have led researchers to believe that the elderly are subject to frontal declines.

Frontal lobe lesions and age influence executive functioning processes in similar, but different ways. Patients with frontal lobe lesions were slower than controls on initiating and inhibiting tasks during the Hayling test, while elderly were only slower than young participants on inhibiting tasks. Elderly and frontal patients both produced a high level of error on the Brixton test, but responses by the elderly was more directly correlated to logical rules.

Further research has shown that as humans age the volume of their prefrontal gray matter declines. This shrinkage in elderly cerebral cortexes could account for some of the mediated age-related influences on executive functions.

=== Attention deficit hyperactivity disorder (ADHD) ===
A fairly recent focus has been placed on understanding the impact Attention deficit hyperactivity disorder has on individuals’ executive processes. People with ADHD share several similar behavioural manifestations with patients confirmed with disruption to executive functions, characteristic of SAS deficiencies. Some of these paralleled behaviours include problems with initiating and regulating appropriate behaviours, inhibiting impulsive behaviours, and sustaining attention and effort temporally.

Children with ADHD have impaired self-regulation of planning and organization. Both children and adolescents with ADHD have cognitive deficits, including reduced academic functioning, learning disorders, speech and language impairments, and intelligence deficits. Children have contorted self-perceptions of themselves like reporting higher self-esteem than deserved, known as a positive illusory bias. Furthermore, their lack of motivation, deficit in working memory, and inability to apply their intelligence is a major proposed cause for their below normal overall intelligence. However, these impairments to executive functioning are not representative of all children and adolescents with Attentional-Deficit/Hyperactivity Disorder.

Stimulant medication for ADHD is widely used for a short-term reduction of symptoms and, in general, medication use can effectively improve an individual's abilities on cognitive tasks, attention, and reducing impulsivity. Furthermore, evidence shows beneficial behavioural effects and an overall benefit to frontal function and cognitive performance. However, the most common side effect can cause an episode of anxiety, mania, and insomnia. Anxiety can inhibit attention and cognition, thus impairing executive functions.

=== Alcohol ===
The influences of alcohol directly, being 'drunk', on an individual's cognitive abilities are obvious. Indirectly, chronic alcohol consumption can have drastic impacts on ones frontal lobes. Detoxified, chronic alcoholic males showed reduced inhibition and flexibility in planning, rule detection, coordination between tasks, and made more errors. These individuals had relatively healthy short-term memories but significantly lacked the ability to direct stored information. Processing speed was not a factor to their executive deficits. Measures included the Tower of London, Brixton test, Hayling task, Trail-making test, Stroop Interference Test, and the Alpha-Span Task. Positron emission topography results verified frontal lobe activation during tests of executive functions in which alcoholic participants showed poor performance.

Alcoholic and drug addictions are largely influenced by automatic processes. These findings could be applied to clinical treatments for detoxified alcoholics pursuing abstinence.

=== Schizophrenia ===
Schizophrenic patients have intellectual, social and language impairments. Schizophrenic's executive functions were examined on planning, inhibition, and abstraction of logical rules using the Tower of London, Hayling, and Brixton tests. Patients were significantly worse on all three tasks compared to control individuals matched for education level, age, and gender. These results indicate that schizophrenic patients either have specific impairments for each of these tasks separately, or there is a general dysfunction that influences all three tasks. The parsimony, as well as complementary findings from other studies would indicate a general deficit in the SAS.

When various statistical correlations were computed, schizophrenic patients were fundamentally related although not entirely paralleled with patients with frontal lobe dysfunction. In contrast to the general impairment imposed for schizophrenics, focal lesions assumed specific deficits.

=== Autistic disorder (AD) ===
Children with autism have an impaired capability to solve problems, engage in thoughtful and appropriate behaviours, sustain relevant tasks and self-monitor. They lack mentalization or Theory of Mind (ToM) and have sensory, perceptual, cognitive, and intellectual deficits. This suggests that children with autism have general deficits in the high-order planning and regulatory systems, known as executive functions. Autistic individuals have an enlarged cortex characterized by irregular neuronal growth, a reduced volume of corpus callosum (impairing communication between hemispheres), abnormal structure and function of the frontal lobe, cerebellum, medial temporal lobe, related limbic systems (amygdala and hippocampus), and elevated levels of serotonin. These brain and molecular abnormalities could account for the characteristic impairment of executive functioning in autistic patients. The SAS is disrupted at some level and intensity in all five of the Pervasive Developmental Disorders (PDD), which include Autism, Asperger syndrome (AS), Rett syndrome, Childhood disintegrative disorder (CDD), and Pervasive developmental disorder not otherwise specified (PDD-NOS).

=== Parkinson's disease (PD) ===
Patients with Parkinson's disease had trouble inhibiting habitual tendencies, constructing new responses, and produced more errors. They showed similar performance to controls on allocating attention and resources of working memory. PD patients also showed impairments in verbal fluency and took longer to respond on tasks. Early, untreated PD patients had the most severe impairment to the SAS, however only certain processes are affected. Treatment substantially improved PD patients' cognitive control.

The influence of Parkinson's disease on the SAS are consistent with those found for carbon monoxide poisoning, and both confirm frontal lobe dysfunctions.

=== Carbon monoxide poisoning ===
Survivors of carbon monoxide poisoning had relatively normal abilities on routine, attentional tasks, but were impaired on high-level functions like attentional switching and control. These lower- and higher-level tasks mirror contention scheduling and the Supervisory Attentional System, respectively. Survivors were significantly slower in performance, and impairments were present for over a 1-month period.
