= Caroline Winnett =

American entrepreneur and civic activist

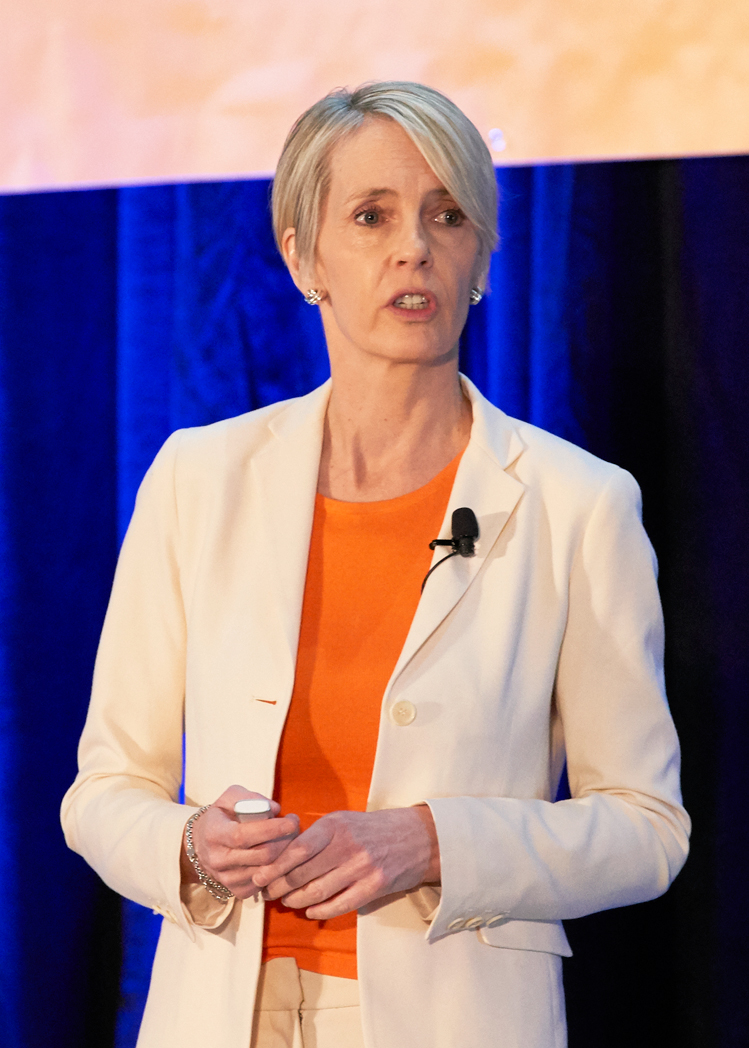
- Education: Brown University; Indiana University School of Music; University of California, Berkeley
- Occupations: Accelerator Director; Investor; Serial Entrepreneur
- Employer: Berkeley SkyDeck
- Known for: NeuroFocus
- Title: Executive Director
- Board member of: Cal Performances, Embee Mobile

Caroline Winnett is the executive director of the Berkeley SkyDeck startup accelerator at the University of California, Berkeley. She is a serial entrepreneur, civic activist, angel investor, advisor and board member of several startups, and a frequent speaker on startups, accelerators, women in business and consumer neuroscience.

== Education ==
Winnett attended Brown University as an undergraduate and got her violin performance degree in 1984 from the Indiana University School of Music. In 1990, Winnett earned her MBA from the Berkeley Haas School of Business. In a 2018 interview, Winnett said that she created her own major in Entrepreneurial Operations because at that time there were no programs at Berkeley for entrepreneurs.

== Civic activism and Berkeley landmarks ==
=== Save Berkeley Iceland ===
In 2008, Winnett was a founder and spokesperson for Save Berkeley Iceland, advocating for the preservation of the 67-year old Olympic-sized historical ice rink in Berkeley, California. She appeared on local NBC News to raise donations and also petitioned the city council. Winnett and the group were able to raise $50,000 and advocated turning the rink into a nonprofit, but in the end were not able to save the rink from closure.

=== SkyDeck signage petition ===
In July 2017, Winnett successfully petitioned the Berkeley city council after a 10-month review process to approve signage on the tallest building in downtown Berkeley, formerly known as the PowerBar building or the Chase Building due to previous signage. The highly-debated building signage named the building "SkyDeck" after Winnett's nonprofit organization, the Berkeley SkyDeck accelerator located on the penthouse floor. Those opposed to the petition argued that the signage was "advertising" and not architectural, while advocates including Winnett argued that the name SkyDeck reflected the Berkeley spirit of innovation. In the end the SkyDeck Building petition was unanimously approved by the council.

== Career ==
=== NeuroFocus ===
In 2006, Winnett co-founded startup NeuroFocus, a company that measures how consumers react to advertising using neurological measurements using EEG sensors. Nielsen Holdings acquired NeuroFocus in 2011.

=== UC Berkeley SkyDeck ===
Winnett joined Berkeley SkyDeck as executive director in 2015, three years after its original founding as a mentoring space. As the new director, Winnett added staff and worked to partner with the resources already in place at Berkeley. With a colleague, Winnett helped to secure a $150,000 grant to build The Berkeley Startup Network platform so that startup resources at Berkeley would be accessible in one place. In a 2018 interview with Xconomy, Winnett noted that the number of SkyDeck startup advisors had increased from 30 to 140, and that the penthouse accelerator had also taken over an additional floor of the high-rise building it was housed in, located next to Berkeley campus.

In Spring 2018, Winnett and SkyDeck raised a $24 million oversubscribed venture fund from investors Sequoia Capital, Mayfield, Sierra Ventures and others. Managed by Winnett's colleague Chon Tang, the Berkeley SkyDeck Fund began offering $100,000 each to startups in return for 5 percent ownership, beginning with a cohort of 20. In a 2019 blog, Winnett expressed a goal that the Berkeley SkyDeck Fund would bring $1 billion in revenue to UC Berkeley in the future.

=== Cal Performances ===
Winnett also serves on the Board of Trustees for Cal Performances, a UC Berkeley performing arts organization.

== Public Speaking ==
Winnett was the opening speaker at the 2020 Taiwan-US Innovation Forum, and urged companies in the 2020 COVID-19 pandemic environment to "focus on the basics", "don't be afraid to change course", and "look for new opportunities". Winnett has also spoken at venues such as the Milan Innovation District and the Rhodes House at the University of Oxford talking about the future of work and innovation.
