= Kiwi Campus =

Colombian-owned delivery robot company

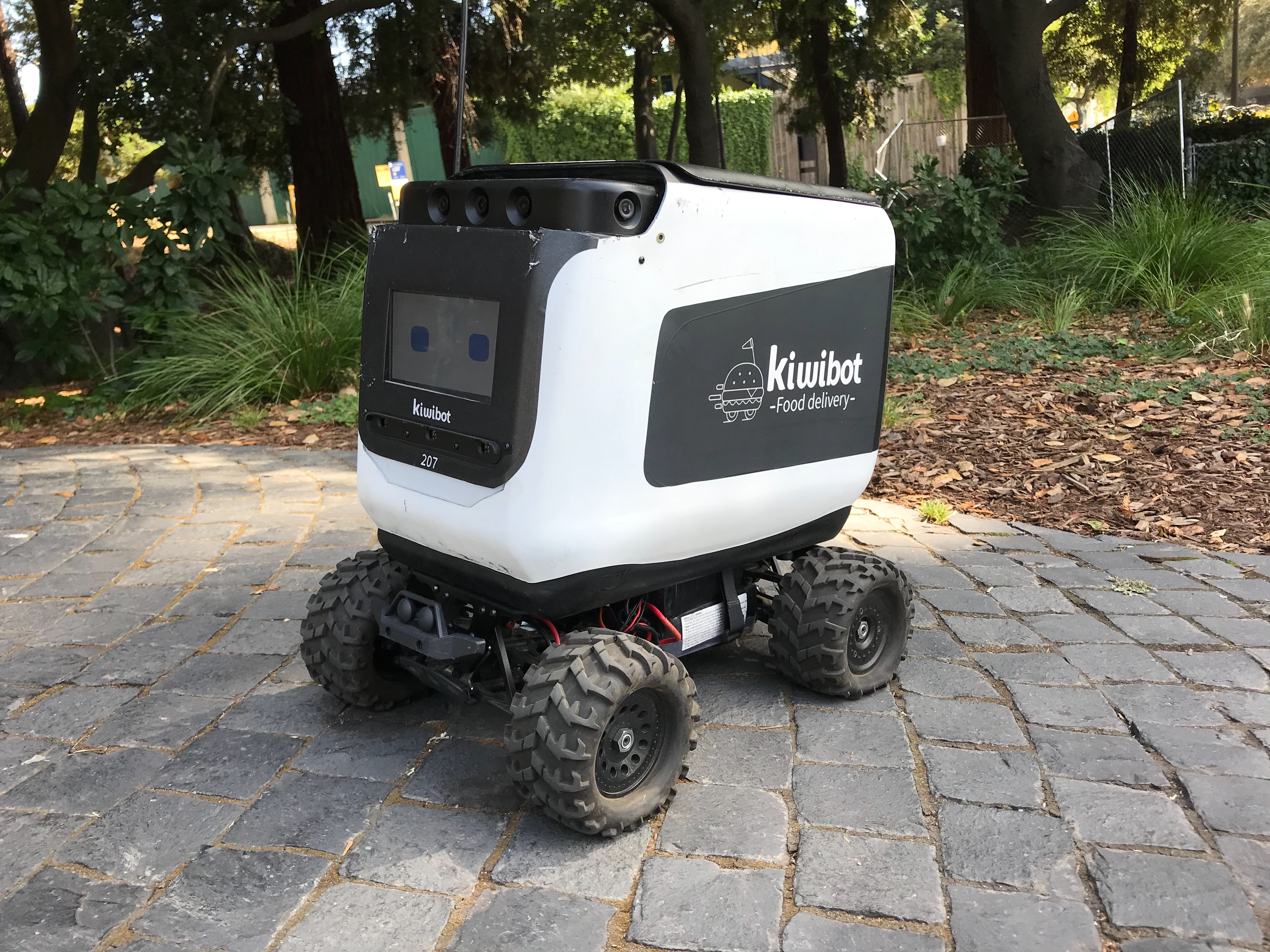
Front view of a 2nd generation Kiwibot.

Kiwi Campus, commonly referred to as Kiwi, is a Colombian-owned startup company providing food deliveries in California, United States, using largely autonomous robots called Kiwibots. Started in 2017 at the University of California, Berkeley, the company also delivers to parts of the city of Berkeley, on the Stanford University campus in Palo Alto, and in San Jose.

== Operations and controversies ==
Kiwi uses three kinds of robots: one to collect prepared orders from the restaurant, a semi-autonomous tricycle in which orders are sorted and taken most of the way to the delivery point, and a small four-wheeled "Kiwibot", which can carry up to five orders and four of which can fit aboard the tricycle, that navigates the last approximately 300 meters to the customer. The company claims an average delivery time of 27 minutes. The Kiwibots have digitally animated eyes; the customer gestures to cause the hatch to open.

The delivery robots, which are manufactured in China and assembled in Berkeley, have approximately a cubic foot of cargo space. They have six cameras and binocular vision for navigation and hazard avoidance and are largely autonomous; human operators at the company's center in Medellín monitor their progress at waypoints and take control when needed, such as when crossing streets. They use artificial intelligence and machine learning, including deep learning, and autonomously modify their speed on sidewalks depending on the proximity of people. Initially an iPhone on top of the robot was the primary sensor, robots had to be trained with repeated runs on each route, and rough sidewalks caused problems for the small wheels, requiring careful human monitoring. When a robot encounters a serious problem, such as tampering or becoming lost because of imprecise GPS, the run is completed by a human on foot or on a Segway.

However, there are controversies regarding how robots work. It was reported that Colombian employees operate the robots not just when they need to, but every 5 to 10 seconds, demystifying the miraculous functioning of the robot's artificial intelligence. The company pays Colombian workers $2/hour, much lower than minimum wage in the United States. The system relies on humans to pick up orders from off-campus restaurants and bring it to bots who only travel an average of 200 m (660 ft).

== History ==
Kiwi Campus grew out of a courier delivery service started by Felipe Chávez, the CEO, in 2015 in Bogotá. In 2016, he founded the current company with CTO Jason Oviedo and COO Sergio Pachón in the SkyDeck business incubator at the University of California, Berkeley, soon substituting robots for human couriers after discovering the cost in the United States; he has said that he was shocked to find that when he ordered a pizza online (or, in an alternate version, a burrito), the delivery charge was almost as high as the price of the pizza. They first tried using a single robot for the entire distance between restaurant and delivery, but found that inefficient.

The prototype Kiwibots were rolled out on the Berkeley campus in March 2017; as of May 23, 20 were operating on campus and in surrounding parts of the city. By early 2018 they were also operating on the Stanford University campus, and by late May 2018 they had filled more than 10,000 orders and were operating throughout the area bounded by Cedar and Sacramento Streets and Ashby and Piedmont Avenues. That month the company was planning expansion to the city of Palo Alto and to San Jose and Los Angeles in the remainder of 2018. Nowadays they expanded into business to business deliveries. Chávez won an entrepreneurship award from MIT in November 2018.

In December 2018, a Kiwibot delivery bot caught fire near the Berkeley student union because of a defective battery; a passerby used a fire extinguisher to put out the fire, and the company temporarily switched to human courier deliveries.

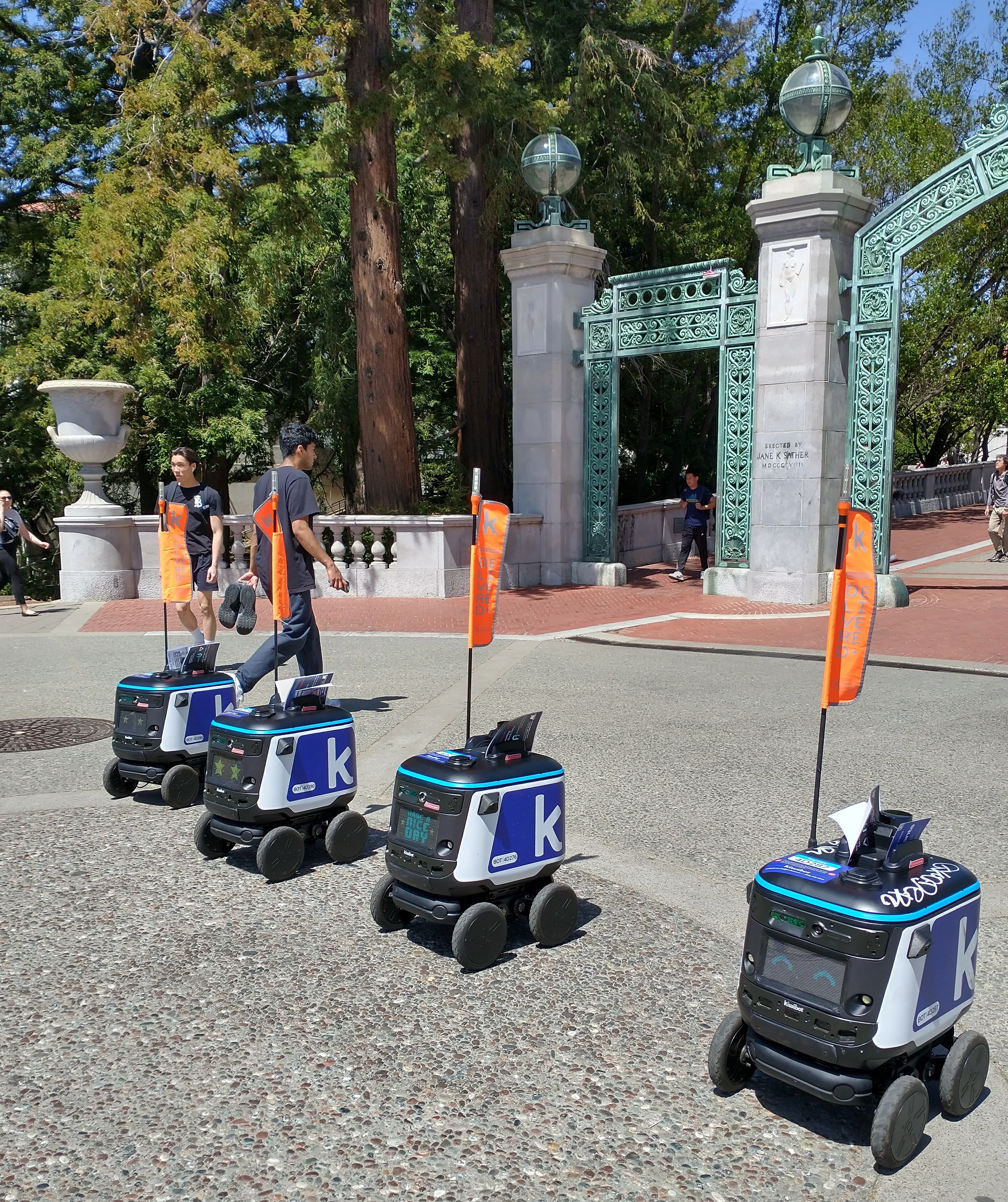
3rd-generation model of Kiwibot delivery robots introduced in 2023

In August 2019, a pilot program in Sacramento was announced. In July 2020, the company began service in San Jose. And for 2024, they are delivering in more than 30 universities across the United States. In April 2024, Kiwi Campus purchased the Taipei-based Auto Mobility Solutions, which specializes in chip manufacturing for robots, citing rising tensions between the US and China.

In September 2025, it was announced that Kiwibots will be going to the UBC Vancouver campus as part of an innovation partnership with Rogers Communications. These bots will act as ambassadors and will help students navigate the bookstore and campus during the new term.
