= Behavior Rating Inventory of Executive Function =

Assessment of executive function behaviors

The Behavior Rating Inventory of Executive Function (BRIEF) is an assessment of executive function behaviors at home and at school for children and adolescents ages 5–18. It was originally developed by Gerard Gioia, Peter Isquith, Steven Guy, and Lauren Kenworthy

The 86-item questionnaire has separate forms for parents and teachers, and typically takes 10–15 minutes to administer and 15–20 minutes to score. Other versions of the BRIEF also exist for preschool children aged 2–5 (BRIEF-P), self-reports of adolescents aged 11–18 (BRIEF-SR), and self/informant-reports of adults aged 18–90 (BRIEF-A).

== History ==
The BRIEF was developed in 2000 to address limitations of available assessments in examining real-world expressions of behaviors related to executive function; the scale was normed on data from 1419 parents (815 girls and 604 boys) and 720 teachers (403 girls and 317 boys) from a representative distribution of socioeconomic statuses. By design, the BRIEF is intended to provide a standardized method of asking multiple raters about executive functions in daily life in a manner that is not specific to any particular disorder. Because it is not disorder-specific, the BRIEF may be used to assess executive function behaviors in children and adolescents experiencing a wide range of difficulties, such as those related to learning, attention, brain injuries, developmental disorders, and various psychiatric conditions and medical issues.

As of 2013, the BRIEF had been translated into 40 different languages or dialects across the various versions of the questionnaire.

== Test format ==
Each form of the BRIEF parent- and teacher- rating form contains 86 items in eight non-overlapping clinical scales and two validity scales. These theoretically and statistically derived scales form two indexes: Behavioral Regulation (three scales) and Metacognition (five scales), as well as a Global Executive Composite score that takes into account all of the clinical scales and represents the child's overall executive function. There are also two validity scales to measure Negativity and Inconsistency of responses. Scores on the Negativity scale measures the extent to which the respondent answered selected items in an unusually negative manner whereas scores on the Inconsistency scale indicate the extent to which the respondent answered similar items in an inconsistent manner.

=== Behavioral regulation scales ===
- Inhibit: Ability to control impulses (inhibitory control) and to stop engaging in a behavior.
- Shift: Ability to move freely from one activity or situation to another; to tolerate change; to switch or alternate attention.
- Emotional Control: Ability to regulate emotional responses appropriately.

=== Metacognition scales ===
- Initiate: Ability to begin an activity and to independently generate ideas or problem-solving strategies.
- Working Memory: Ability to hold information when completing a task, when encoding information, or when generating goals/plans in a sequential manner.
- Plan/Organize: Ability to anticipate future events; to set goals; to develop steps; to grasp main ideas; to organize and understand the main points in written or verbal presentations.
- Organization of Materials: Ability to put order in work, play and storage spaces (e.g., desks, lockers, backpacks, and bedrooms).
- Monitor: Ability to check work and to assess one's own performance; ability to keep track of the effect of one's own behavior on other people.

== Administration ==
The BRIEF is very simple to administer and only requires a copy of the form and a pencil. The parent form is filled out by a parent (preferably by both parents). The only important criterion is they need to have had recent contact with the child over the past six months. Similarly, the teacher form can be filled out by any adult (teacher or aide) who has had extended contact with the child in a school setting during the past month. Multiple ratings across classrooms are strongly recommended, as they are useful for comparison purposes.

== Reliability and validity ==
Questions selected for inclusion in the BRIEF were determined based on inter-rater reliability correlations and item-total correlations that had the highest probability of being informative for the clinician. The BRIEF has demonstrated good reliability, with high test-retest reliability (rs ≈ .88 for teachers, .82 for parents) internal consistency (Cronbach's alphas ≈ .80 – .98), and moderate correlations between parent and teacher ratings (rs ≈ .32 – .34). Evidence for the convergent and divergent aspects of the BRIEF's validity comes through its correlation with other measures of emotional and behavioral functioning. The BRIEF has also demonstrated utility in differentiating clinical and non-clinical children and adolescents with attention deficit/hyperactivity disorder (ADHD).

== Scoring and interpretation ==
Raw scores for all scales of the BRIEF questionnaire can be computed with the Software Portfolio (BRIEF-SP). This computer program provides separate normative tables for both the Parent and Teacher Forms in which figure T scores, percentiles, and 90% confidence intervals for four developmental age groups (5–18 years) by gender of the child. T scores provide information about the child's individual scores relative to the scores of other respondents in the standardization sample. Percentiles represent the percentage of children in the standardization sample who fall below a given raw score.

When interpreting the data, it is important to remember that all results "should be viewed in the context of a complete evaluation". Clinical information gathered from the BRIEF questionnaire is best understood within the context of a full assessment that includes a description of the history of the child and the family and observations of the child's behavior. Accordingly, high scores obtained on the BRIEF do not indicate a "disorder of executive function" but rather suggest a higher level of dysfunction in a specific domain of executive functions. Particular attention should also be paid to the Inconsistency scale given that score equal or higher than 7 is indicative of a high degree of inconsistency in rater response.

== Uses ==
The BRIEF is useful for evaluating children with a variety of disorders and disabilities. Specifically, it is often used for assessing executive functioning in children with developmental and/or acquired neurological conditions including: learning disabilities, tourette syndrome, traumatic brain injury, pervasive developmental disorders, autism, low birth weight. The BRIEF is most often used to assess attention deficit hyperactivity disorder.

== Attention deficit/hyperactivity disorder ==
The BRIEF is often used to evaluate ADHD in children and has been shown to be superior to other rating systems such as the Behavior Assessment System for Children (BASC) as it taps into unique behaviors typically associated with the disorder (e.g., working memory, metacognitive skills)

McCandless & O'Laughlin (2007) found that the Metacognitive and Behavioral Regulation scales of the BRIEF are clinically useful for identifying children with and without ADHD. Specifically, the Metacognitive Scale (Working Memory subscale) is useful for identifying the presence of ADHD whereas the Behavioural Regulation scale (Inhibit subscale) has demonstrated clinical utility at distinguishing between the inattentive and combined (i.e., inattentive and hyperactive) subtypes of the disorder.

The BRIEF has also been useful for highlighting differences between ADHD and other diagnoses. For example, Pratt (2000) examined parent reports on the BRIEF for children (ages 6–11) who had a diagnosis of ADHD, ADHD and reading disorder (RD), RD only, or no diagnosis. Children with ADHD demonstrated higher scores on all of the BRIEF scales compared to children with no formal diagnosis. Children with a reading disorder showed greater difficulties on the Working Memory and the Plan/Organize subscales of the Metacognitive Scale. The BRIEF has been less useful for distinguishing between children with ADHD and tourette syndrome.
