= Pediatric Attention Disorders Diagnostic Screener =

Suite of neuropsychological tests of attention and executive functioning

The Pediatric Attention Disorders Diagnostic Screener (PADDS), created by Dr. Thomas K. Pedigo and Kenneth L. Pedigo, is a suite of computer administered neuropsychological tests of attention and executive functioning. The PADDS is used in the diagnosis of attention deficit hyperactivity disorder (ADHD) in children between the ages of 6 and 12 years. The PADDS software program represents a multi-dimensional, evidence-based approach to ADHD assessment, consisting of the Computer Administered Diagnostic Interview (CADI), the Swanson, Nolan, and Pelham—IV (SNAP-IV) Parent and Teacher rating scales, and the three computer-administered objective measures of the Target Tests of Executive Functioning (TTEF). It calculates a diagnostic likelihood ratio, where each data source is allowed to contribute to (or detract from) the prediction of the diagnosis, as well as normalized relative standard scores, t-scores, z-scores, and percentile ranks for comparison to the non-clinical reference group.

== PADDS history and development ==
One of the most commonly diagnosed childhood disorders referred to mental health clinicians is ADHD. It is a complicated neurodevelopmental psychiatric disorder and has an estimated range of occurrence of 2 to 3 percent of the school population and up to 10 percent in other settings. Thus, on average a minimum of at least one child with ADHD and executive functioning disorders is in each classroom in American schools. (Reddy et al.) Rowland, Leswesne, & Abramowitz (2002) indicated that prevalence rates for ADHD vary markedly based on presenting symptoms, assessment approaches used, and the setting in which the child was tested. A lack of a consensus on what constitutes the core set of symptoms for ADHD confounds the screening and assessment process (Brown, 2002).

Due to the concerns regarding prevalence rates of ADHD, the American Academy of Pediatrics (AAP, 2000) and the National Institute of Health (NIH, 1998) have stressed the need to develop new standardized, evidence-based assessments that have strong psychometric properties, and are easily administered in schools and other clinical settings. The major consideration guiding the development of the PADDS is integrating an updated construct of ADHD assessment, while focusing on ways to enhance diagnostic accuracy in an efficient manner. Clinical testing of the PADDS Target Tests of Executive Functioning was conducted on one of the largest samples of age specific, ADHD and non-ADHD subjects collected, with 725 children (240 females and 485 males) age 6 to 12 years (M = 8.63, SD = 1.72) split approximately evenly between those diagnosed with ADHD (n = 395) and age matched Non-ADHD peers (n = 330). Data were collected in seven states from 10 data collection sites. Institutional Review Board (IRB) approval for the overall project was established through Armstrong Atlantic State University in Savannah, Georgia. All research sites included specialty ADHD assessment centers, each with independent IRB oversight, in Illinois, Georgia, Idaho, New Jersey, Tennessee, California, and Florida. (Pedigo, Pedigo & Scott 2008)

== Screening for possible comorbid conditions ==
The Computer Administered Diagnostic Interview (CADI) is used for comorbid screening, to assist clinicians with the collection and consolidation of pertinent patient information. The clinical protocol consists of 113 questions covering the major domains of co-occurring disorders. These areas include a medical and developmental history, emotional/social functioning, depression and anxiety symptoms, behavioral issues, school history, and attention/hyperactivity symptoms. This information is necessary to help structure an individual assessment process and to support recommendations for treatment. The information is reviewed, with the parent or guardian, for cross validation of any concerns.

== Screening for inattention and hyperactivity ==
The Swanson, Nolan, and Pelham—IV (SNAP-IV) rating scale forms are included for parent/guardian and teachers to complete. The rating scales offer categorical and dimensional input across the 18 core diagnostic items from the Diagnostic and Statistical Manual of Mental Disorders DSM-IV Fourth Edition-Revised. Each item is rated on a 4-point Likert scale for severity. These behavioral criteria have produced reliable sensitivity and specificity in identifying ADHD cases relative to non-clinical reference groups. (Power, T. J., Andrews, T. J., Eiraldi, R. B., Doherty, B. J., Ikeda, M. J., DuPaul, G. J., & Landau, S.; 1998)(Zolotor, A. J., & Mayer, J.; 2004)

== Objective measures ==
The Target Tests of Executive Functioning (TTEF) consist of three target subtests: Target Recognition, Target Sequencing and Target Tracking. They are designed to place distinctly different demands on areas of executive functioning important to ADHD assessment.(Biederman, J., Monuteaux, M. C., Doyle, A. E., Seidman, L. J., Wilens, T. E., Ferrero, F., Morgan, C. L., & Faraone, S. V.; 2004). The tests tap working memory, sequential memory and procedural memory functions, and help provide an objective assessment of a subject's ability to employ executive processes such as planning, attending, organizing input, storing and retrieving information, modulating emotions and sustaining effort. These task demands have been consistently identified as difficult for children known to have ADHD.(Russell Barkley; 1997)

=== Demands basic to all three target subtests ===
- The child is pre-loaded to search and detect relevant information
- The child must inhibit irrelevant stimuli
- The child must use a metacognitive strategy forcing the use of internal dialogue
- The child must wait a short lag time before employing task demands
- The child must inhibit while formulating a plan of action
- The child must formulate, reconstitute and execute plans in the face of changing or novel stimuli
- The child must be sensitive and responsive to feedback
- The child must be able to do the above to discover that there are recurrent patterns presented in the task demands
- The child must employ motivational and emotional control in the service of ongoing activity
- The child must evaluate outcome against plans, intentions and feedback to direct future efforts accurately

=== Task specific demands for target recognition ===
Target Recognition takes approximately 8–10 minutes to complete. This subtest presents five large colored squares with smaller squares inside them. Below the squares are five small boxes labeled 1 to 5. The colored squares simultaneously blink on and off the screen at 1 ½ second intervals in differing patterns, for a total of 153 presentations. The child is taught a strategy to read from left to right and to count the number of large squares with small squares inside them of the same color and then to click on the corresponding number in the small box below. Specific requirements for task completion include among others: attention to detail, avoiding distraction, maintenance of effort or persistence, holding information in mind through the use of metacognition, feedback, and emotional regulation while developing a response to changes in novel stimuli.

=== Task specific demands for target sequencing ===
Target Sequencing takes approximately 8–10 minutes to complete. This subtest presents five large colored circles. A small colored square moves through each of them starting in the middle or at either of the end circles. The child is taught to attend only to circles when the square matches it in color and to say the name of the color to him or herself while disregarding the circles that have squares with a different color. Once the squares have moved through all five circles the child clicks on each of the circles that had matching colors in the same order that they stated to him/herself—first match first, second match second and last match last. Specific requirements for task completion include among others: attention to detail, avoiding distraction, maintenance of effort or persistence, holding information in mind through the use of metacognition, feedback, and emotional regulation during the initiation and follow through of a response to complex sequences while remaining sensitive to changes in novel stimuli.

=== Task specific demands for target tracking ===
Target Tracking takes approximately 8–10 minutes to complete, This subtest presents four colored shapes at the top and bottom of the screen. The computer creates, one move at a time, two and three-step moves that the child must repeat/recreate in the same order seen—first move first, second move second and last move last. Specific requirements for task completion include among others: attention to detail, maintaining divided attention, holding information in mind, maintenance of effort or persistence and emotional regulation while completing complex two and three-step instructions.

=== Scoring and reporting ===
The PADDS System and Summary Reports presents the incremental input of multiple forms of information that research has shown to be most reliable and valid for ADHD assessment. (Frazier & Youngstrom; 2006) The PADDS system uses a comparison of two well-defined reference groups, namely ADHD and Non-ADHD. Each component is calculated in an additive or subtractive manner for and against a diagnosis in consideration of the ADHD Base rate. The inputs are displayed in a real time format via a computer generated Nomogram presenting an individual and an overall predictive index of likelihood ratios establishing evidence for or against a diagnosis. Results are likewise presented in a normalized, relative Standard score, T-score, Z-Score, and Percentile rank format for comparison to the non-clinical reference group.

The nomographic display of the individual and cumulative inputs is evaluated stepwise via the calculation of likelihood ratios applied incrementally with a Fagan's Nomogram (Fagan TJ; 1975) to produce an overall predictive index beginning with a calculated base rate, and combining the results of the other measures, in either an additive or subtractive manner, to provide a post-test probability. When used in conjunction with clinical judgment, these components have proven to be highly effective for consideration of diagnosis and in highlighting and documenting a need for further evaluation or actions, and may allow the clinician to evaluate their own diagnostic practices and effectiveness over time.

== Clinical use of the Pediatric Attention Disorders Diagnostic Screener (PADDS) ==
PADDS is used by: Child Psychiatrists, Child Psychologists, Neuro-psychologists, School Psychologists and Pediatricians

The PADDS is published by and available from Targeted Testing, Inc. and other major psychological test publishers.

== See also ==
- Clinical neuropsychology
- Neuropsychological tests
- Clinical Psychology
- Executive functioning
