= Hayling and Brixton tests =

- Purpose: test of executive function

The Hayling and Brixton tests are neuropsychological tests of executive function created by psychologists Paul W. Burgess and Tim Shallice. It is composed of two tests, the Hayling Sentence Completion Test and the Brixton Spatial Awareness Test.

== The Hayling Sentence Completion Test ==
The Hayling Sentence Completion test is a measure of response initiation and response suppression. It consists of two sets of 15 sentences each having the last word missing. In the first section the examiner reads each sentence aloud and the participant has to simply complete the sentences, yielding a simple measure of response initiation speed. The second part of the Hayling requires participants to complete a sentence with a nonsense ending word (and suppress a sensible one), giving measures of response suppression ability and thinking time.

This test is entirely spoken and is thus suitable for people with a wide range of problems such as those involving reading, visual perception, or movement. It takes approximately five minutes to administer yet yields three different measures of executive functioning which can be considered separately or combined into an overall score.

== The Brixton Spatial Anticipation Test ==
The Brixton test is a visuospatial sequencing task with rule changes. This test measures the ability to detect rules in sequences of stimuli. It usually takes between five and ten minutes to administer, and yields an easily understood scaled score of between 1 and 10.

The Brixton Test is perceptually simple and does not require a verbal response. It is thus appropriate for people who are suffering from a wide range of associated deficits such as those involving speech production or reading.

== Clinical uses of the Hayling and Brixton tests ==
The tests are used by clinical neuropsychologists to assess executive functioning in people with neurological disorders such as tumors, strokes, acquired brain injury, Parkinson's disease, dementia, Korsakoff's syndrome, encephalitis, and also psychiatric diseases such as schizophrenia.
