= Terence Picton =

Terence "Terry" W. Picton is a Canadian Professor Emeritus of neuroscience at the University of Toronto.

== Early life and career ==
Terence Picton was born in England in 1945 and spent the first 11 years of his life in Ipswich in East Anglia. In 1956 he emigrated to Canada on the SS Homeric. There, from the immigration office in Quebec City he travelled via train to Toronto. After graduating from high school he attended University of Toronto where he played rugby and studied medicine, graduating in 1967 with an M.D. degree.

Eventually, after a long canoe trip on George River in Northern Quebec, Picton decided to become a Canadian citizen. He pursued a medical internship in Vancouver where he became known as the "hippie doctor" due to his beard and long hair. He then studied neuroscience with Robert Galambos at the University of California, San Diego from which he got a Ph.D. in 1973.

A year later, he returned to Canada and joined the Department of Medicine in Ottawa, where he specialized in EEG, EMG, and event-related potentials. In 1994 he accepted a full-time position at the Rotman Research Institute at Baycrest Centre for Geriatric Care in Toronto. Three years later, he became Anne and Max Tanenbaum Chair of cognitive neuroscience and in 2006 became a fellow of the Royal Society of Canada.

== Works ==
- 2010 – Human Auditory Evoked Potentials
- 2013 – Creature and Creator
