= D2 Test of Attention =

Neuropsychological test

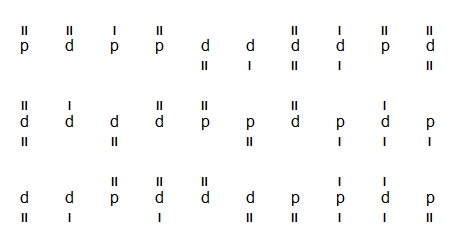
- d2 Test
- Purpose: measure of selective and sustained attention

The d2 Test of Attention is a neuropsychological measure of selective and sustained attention and visual scanning speed. It is a paper and pencil test that asks participants to cross out any letter "d" with two marks around above it or below it in any order. The surrounding distractors are usually similar to the target stimulus, for example a "p" with two marks or a "d" with one or three marks. The original version of the test was created by Brickenkamp (1981) in Germany as a cancellation task. A meta-analysis, published in Personality and Individual Differences, found that adults have shown increasing scores in selective attention over the past three decades, as measured by the d2 Test of Attention.
