= Tim Shallice =

British cognitive psychologist and professor of neuropsychology

Timothy Shallice (born 1940) is a professor of neuropsychology and the founding director of the Institute of Cognitive Neuroscience, part of University College London. He has been a professor at Cognitive Neuroscience Sector of the International School for Advanced Studies (SISSA) in Trieste, Italy since 1994 but is now retired.

Shallice has been influential in laying the foundations for the discipline of cognitive neuropsychology, by formalising many of its methods and assumptions in his 1988 book From Neuropsychology to Mental Structure. He has also worked on many core problems in cognitive psychology and neuropsychology, including executive function, language and memory. Together with psychologist Don Norman, Shallice proposed a framework of attentional control of executive functioning. One of the components of the Norman-Shallice model is the supervisory attentional system. The model is viewed as a possible realization of Alexander Luria's theory in information-processing terms.

Together with John Fox, Shallice was also awarded a grant on cognitive modelling by the United Kingdom's Joint Council Initiative in Cognitive Science and Human-Computer Interaction. The project developed an existing specification language for cognitive modelling and resulted to a prototype COGENT system.

Shallice also co-authored a study on the relationship of prospective and retrospective memory using neuropsychological evidence with Paul W. Burgess. Shallice contributed in the development of neuropsychological tests including the Hayling and Brixton tests and the Behavioural Assessment of the Dysexecutive Syndrome (BADS).

He was elected a Fellow of the Royal Society in 1996.

== Publications ==
=== Books ===
- Shallice, Tim (1988). From Neuropsychology to Mental Structure. Cambridge: Cambridge University Press. ISBN 978-0-52-130874-8. (also available in paperback and Adobe eBook)
- Shallice, Tim; Cooper, Rick (2011). The Organisation of Mind. Vol. 48. Oxford: Oxford University Press. pp. 1366–70. doi:10.1016/j.cortex.2011.07.004. ISBN 978-0-19-957924-2. PMID 23040241. S2CID 5559324.
