= Robert T. Knight =

American neurologist and academic

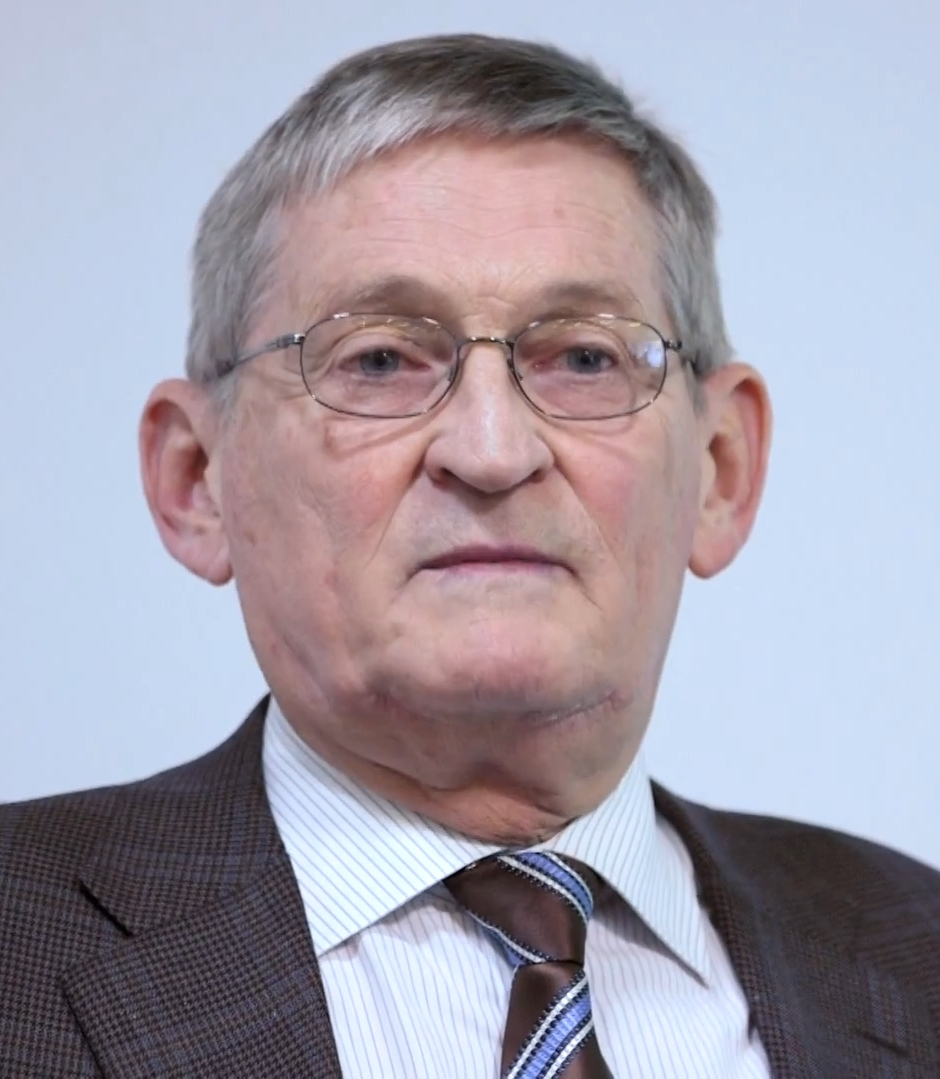
Robert T. Knight at the 2015 World Economic Forum

Robert Thomas Knight is an American neurologist and Professor of Psychology and Neuroscience (UC Berkeley) as well as Neurology and Neurosurgery (UC San Francisco). His work is focused on attention and memory, neuropsychology, physiology, and cognitive neuroscience. He is an Elected Fellow of the American Academy of Arts & Sciences.

== Early life ==
Knight was born and raised in New Jersey. Knight has one brother, who is a botanist. He received a BS in Physics from the Illinois Institute of Technology and a M.D. from Northwestern University. After medical school, he did a residency in neurology at UC San Diego followed by postdoctoral research at the Salk Institute. From 1980–1998 he was a Professor in the Neurology Department at UC Davis. Since 2000 he has been a professor at UC Berkeley in the Department of Psychology, and he served as the Director of the UC Berkeley Helen Wills Neuroscience Institute from 2001 to 2011.

== Awards ==
Knight has received numerous scientific awards for his research into the neural mechanisms of frontal lobe function in cognition. He is an elected Fellow to the American Association for the Advancement of Science as well as a member of the American Academy of Arts and Sciences. He has received both an IBM Cognitive Computing Award as well as the Humboldt Prize. In 2013 he received the Distinguished Career Contribution Award from the Cognitive Neuroscience Society.

== Books ==
Stuss & Knight (2002 and 2013) Principles of Frontal Lobe Function.
