= Berkeley SkyDeck =

Startup accelerator and incubator

- Industry: Seed accelerator
- Founded: 2012
- Headquarters: Berkeley, California
- Key people: Caroline Winnett (Executive Director)
- Products: Venture capital
- Website: skydeck.berkeley.edu

Berkeley SkyDeck (SkyDeck) is an entrepreneurship startup accelerator and incubator program which serves as a joint venture between the Haas School of Business and Berkeley College of Engineering at the University of California, Berkeley. Founded in 2012, SkyDeck promotes research and entrepreneurship in Silicon Valley. It has become a top university incubator in both the United States and also worldwide.

== Program ==
Startup companies join the Berkeley SkyDeck accelerator for six months (one university semester). Startups accepted into the highest level cohort track receive $50,000 when they join, and $50,000 three months in—a total of $100,000 to use to build their businesses. In exchange, SkyDeck takes a five percent equity in each cohort startup.

The six-month SkyDeck term finishes with a demo day when startups in the SkyDeck cohort present to hundreds of investors, seeking venture capital financing. SkyDeck alumni startups include unicorn Lime, a transportation company with e-scooters, electric bikes, and carsharing, and Kiwi Campus, a food-delivery service using autonomous robots.

In 2018, SkyDeck raised a $24 million, oversubscribed venture fund from investors including Sequoia Capital, Mayfield and Sierra Ventures. With this fund SkyDeck is allowed to invest up to ten percent in each cohort startup's first funding round, up to $2 million. In 2022, SkyDeck announced it had raised $60 million, in an oversubscribed Fund II.
