= Harcourt Assessment =

Educational testing and assessment organization

- Parent company: Harcourt
- Status: Defunct
- Predecessor: The Psychological Corporation, World Book Company
- Founded: 1921
- Founder: James McKeen Cattell
- Successor: Pearson Education
- Country of origin: United States
- Publication types: testing materials

Harcourt Assessment was a company that published and distributed educational and psychological assessment tools and therapy resources and provided educational assessment and data management services for national, state, district and local assessments. On January 30, 2008, Harcourt Assessment was merged into Pearson's Assessment & Information group after being acquired from Reed Elsevier for $950 million.

== History ==
Harcourt Assessment's history dates to the early part of the 20th century. Although the company name derives from Harcourt Brace & Company, which was established in 1919, the corporate heritage goes back to 1905 and the founding of World Book Company. Many of the educational products produced by Harcourt Assessment originated at World Book. The psychological assessments originated at The Psychological Corporation, which was founded in 1921.

=== Harcourt Brace & Company (1919) ===
Alfred Harcourt and Donald Brace were friends at Columbia University in New York, and both worked for Henry Holt & Company before founding their own publishing company in 1919. Harcourt Brace & Company published the works of a number of world-renowned writers, including Sinclair Lewis, Virginia Woolf, T. S. Eliot, James Thurber, George Orwell and Robert Penn Warren.

By 1960, Harcourt Brace led the market in high school textbook publishing, but had little presence in the elementary school market. That year, William Jovanovich, who had become president of the company in 1954, took the company public and merged Harcourt Brace & Company with World Book Company to create Harcourt, Brace & World, Inc. This was a strategic move that had a long-term impact on the company because World Book was an established elementary textbook publisher and a test publisher.

In 1970, the company became known as Harcourt Brace Jovanovich (HBJ), with William Jovanovich as chairman. That same year, the company acquired The Psychological Corporation. Under Jovanovich's leadership, the company diversified into non-publishing businesses such as insurance and business consulting. It also bought several theme parks—including SeaWorld, which it acquired in 1976 for $46 million. The company divested its theme park division in 1989 for $1.1 billion.

=== World Book Company (1905) ===
World Book Company opened its first office in Manila in 1905 and published English-language educational materials for schools in the Philippines. The company later moved to New York City, where it became a test publisher. Much of the company's success was based on the work of Arthur S. Otis, who was best known for the intelligence tests he developed for the U.S. Army. Millions of World War I draftees took Otis’ tests.

World Book Company became the first publisher of group-administered tests measuring mental ability when it published Otis’ Group Intelligence Scale in 1918. Otis joined World Book in 1921. By the time World Book merged with Harcourt Brace in 1960, it had a portfolio of educational tests, including the Stanford Achievement Test (1923), the Metropolitan Achievement Test (1932) and the Otis Mental Ability Test (1936).

World Book Company was not related to World Book, Inc., the Chicago-based publisher of encyclopedias and other reference books.

=== The Psychological Corporation (1921) ===
Psychologist James McKeen Cattell founded The Psychological Corporation in New York in 1921. Cattell was a leading figure in psychology and was the president of the American Psychological Association, as well as founder and editor of Scientific Monthly and head of Columbia University’s psychology department. At age 60, when Columbia dismissed him because of his public opposition to the draft in World War I, Cattell decided to pursue his interest in publishing. He joined forces with two former graduate students, Robert Sessions Woodworth and Edward Lee Thorndike.

Both were eminent psychologists, and Thorndike was regarded as the foremost authority on the analysis and measurement of learning. The three men started a business to market psychological tests and related materials to educational, corporate and government clients. In 1939, the company published the Wechsler-Bellevue Intelligence Scales. David Wechsler was a former student of Woodworth at Columbia University.

In 1970, Harcourt Brace Jovanovich acquired The Psychological Corporation and, in 1976, merged its educational testing department, acquired from World Book Company in 1960, into The Psychological Corporation.

In the 1980s and 1990s, The Psychological Corporation (TPC) expanded through a number of acquisitions. In 1986, the company acquired Merrill Publishing's test division with its portfolio of tests for language, speech and hearing. In 1993, it acquired Cognitronics Corporation. In 1994, the company acquired Communication Skill Builders/Therapy Skill Builders and its therapy products for speech-language pathologists, occupational therapists and physical therapists.

In 1983, The Psychological Corporation moved from New York to Cleveland. When the company moved to San Antonio, Texas, in 1985, it established its own operational services, including customer service, warehouse, distribution, information technology, scoring and reporting services.

In order to establish a stronger identity for its educational assessment products, and to link them more closely to the Harcourt name, The Psychological Corporation's education testing unit was branded as Harcourt Brace Educational Measurement in 1995. The name was shortened in 1999 to Harcourt Educational Measurement.

=== Harcourt General, Harcourt, Inc. and Harcourt Assessment, Inc. ===
In 1991, General Cinema Corporation, a diversified company that operated retailers such as Neiman Marcus and Bergdorf Goodman, as well as a national chain of movie theaters, acquired Harcourt Brace Jovanovich for more than $1.5 billion. In 1993, General Cinema Corporation renamed itself Harcourt General and restored the publishing division's name to the historic Harcourt Brace & Company. At the end of the year, Harcourt General divested its cinema division.

In 1999, Harcourt General divested its retail division and shortened the publishing division's name to Harcourt, Inc. That same year, Harcourt, Inc. adopted the brand name Harcourt Assessment for its testing businesses. At the time, Harcourt Assessment comprised The Psychological Corporation, which was known as the clinical division, and Harcourt Educational Measurement, which was known as the education division.

In late 2003, the testing business legally changed its name to Harcourt Assessment, Inc., and unified its two divisions into one operating company. The company retired the two division names – Harcourt Educational Measurement and The Psychological Corporation – although it retained “PsychCorp” as a brand imprint for select products.

=== Reed Elsevier Group plc ===
In 2001, the Anglo-Dutch publishing company Reed Elsevier acquired Harcourt General and Harcourt, Inc., including the business then known as Harcourt Assessment, Inc. Harcourt Assessment encountered two straight years with mass layoffs as a result of poor management and a failed strategy to expand into the state assessment market. In January 2006, more than 70 workers were laid off. Shortly after the layoffs, division president Jeff Galt left the company, and was replaced by Michael E. Hansen, who moved from Bertelsmann. Then again in January 2007, 122 workers lost their jobs. On February 15, 2007, Reed Elsevier announced its intention to sell its education arm, Harcourt Education, of which Harcourt Assessment is a part. According to Reed Chief Executive Crispin Davis, "This is essentially a strategic decision that we want to focus more sharply on our three existing businesses ... with better growth rates".

=== Pearson Education plc ===
On May 4, 2007, Pearson, the international education and information company, announced that it had agreed to acquire Harcourt Assessment and Harcourt Education International from Reed Elsevier for $950m in cash. The sale of the two units left Reed Elsevier with most of Harcourt Education still to sell, comprising its large U.S. textbook business and a number of supplemental publishing businesses. Pearson already held a market-leading position in the U.S. textbook market and would not be interested in the main Harcourt business on account of regulatory concerns. Reed stated that it expected to complete the sale in the second half of the year and would use the funds raised to return cash to shareholders.

On January 30, 2008, Pearson completed the acquisition of Harcourt Assessment, Inc., having obtained all necessary regulatory approvals. Doug Kubach, president of Pearson's Assessment & Information group, led the integration of Harcourt Assessment into Pearson.

== Products ==
- Beck Depression Inventory (BDI)
- Beck Hopelessness Scale (BHS)
- Bracken School Ability Assessment
- Differential Ability Scales
- Gifted Rating Scales
- Hayling and Brixton tests
- Miller Analogies Test (MAT)
- NEPSY
- Otis-Lennon School Ability Test
- Pharmacy College Admission Test
- Raven's Progressive Matrices
- Stanford Achievement Test
- Versant Spoken English Test
- Wechsler Adult Intelligence Scale (WAIS)
- Wechsler Intelligence Scale for Children (WISC)
- Wechsler Preschool and Primary Scale of Intelligence (WPPSI)

== Sources ==
- Harcourt Assessment. Company History.
