= American Authors and Books =

Reference work about American literature

- Third edition, 1972
- Author: William Jeremiah Burke and Will D. Howe (1st edition); Irving Weiss (2d edition); Irving Weiss and Anne Weiss (3d edition)
- Publisher: Gramercy Publishing Company (1st edition); Crown Publishing Group (2d and 3d editions)
- Publication date: 1943, 1962, 1972

American Authors and Books is a reference work about American literature. Editions, with varying subtitles, were published in 1943, 1962, and 1972.

The first edition, American Authors and Books: 1640–1940, edited by William Jeremiah Burke and Will D. Howe, was published in 1943 by Gramercy Publishing Company (now part of Crown Publishing Group). The 1943 edition ran to 858 pages. When the first edition was published, both Burke and Howe were on staff at Charles Scribner's Sons.

A review by Rollo G. Silver in American Literature compared the first edition to The Oxford Companion to American Literature, edited by James D. Hart, but noted that American Authors listed far more people than the Companion. Booklist likewise compared the 1943 American Authors to the Companion, describing it as a "quick reference tool".

A second edition, updated by Irving Weiss, was released by Crown Publishers in 1962. Weiss's edition updated the book to include entries from 1940 to shortly before the new edition was published. A review by John Barkham upon the publication of the second edition described American Authors as a "widely-used reference text to American writing".

Crown published the third edition, titled American Authors and Books: 1640 to the Present Day, in 1972. It was updated and revised by Irving Weiss and Anne Weiss. This edition contained around 17,000 entries about authors, publications, and publishers, among other topics, and had 719 pages. The third edition had some errors but was generally of "high quality".
