= Copyright Society of the U.S.A. =

The Copyright Society of the U.S.A., now the Copyright Society, is the primary scholarly society dedicated to the study of copyright law in the United States.

The Copyright Society of the U.S.A. was established in 1953, by a number of copyright scholars and lawyers including Charles B. Seton (1910–2005). It established the journal Bulletin of the Copyright Society of the U.S.A. the same year, which is published today as the Journal of the Copyright Society.

The Society hosts annual and midwinter meetings, as well as a variety of educational sessions in its regional chapters. The organization has fifteen chapters throughout the US and abroad, and is headquartered in New York City. The Society hosts the annual "Donald C. Brace Memorial Lecture" (named after Donald Brace, one of the founders of the Harcourt, Brace & Co. publishing company), and presents the annual "Seton Award" for scholarship by a young writer (under 40).
