= Gifted Rating Scales =

The Gifted Rating Scale (GRS) is a scholastic assessment for school children. It is used mostly for Gifted & Talented admissions. It is administered by a teacher who knows the child well. The teacher rates specific gifted behaviors that they have observed over time.

== History ==
Rating scales have developed since the early 1970s to assess general child psychometrics and psychopathology.

The Gifted Rating Scales, first published in 2003, are authored by Steven Ira Pfeiffer (1950-), and Tania Jarosewich. The GRS is completed through teacher evaluations and measures giftedness on multiple scales.

The GRS-P, designed for children in preschool and kindergarten, evaluates children on five scales:

1. Intellectual ability
2. Academic ability
3. Creativity
4. Artistic talent
5. Motivation

The GRS-S, designed for children in grades 1–8, evaluates giftedness in children on six scales:

1. Intellectual ability
2. Academic ability
3. Creativity
4. Artistic talent
5. Leadership ability
6. Motivation

Notwithstanding skepticism — that laypeople lack expertise, objectivity, and consistency to administer the GRS — Harbrace contends that the GRS, by design, allows for minimal observational bias and a high degree of measurement accuracy, especially at higher levels.

One of the best advantages of using the GRS, as compared to interviews, is that it is easy to administer and less expensive than traditional large-scale testing. Time for administration is usually modest. Rater bias and subjectivity of responding can be reduced by using a standardized presentation of questions, though this has yet to be researched. The GRS can be routinely administered in schools. While the GRS itself is fairly new, rating scales tend to have good data on reliability and validity.

GRS validation studies have been accepted for publication in journals including Gifted Child Quarterly, which has accepted three GRS validity studies, the Journal of Psychoeducational Assessment and the Roeper Review. Research on the topic of the GRS has been published by the authors of the GRS, or one of their current or former students. Interested persons should consult the Buros Mental Measurement Yearbook review of the GRS for additional information on this and other rating scales.

Harcourt Assessment, Inc. is a unit of Harcourt Education, which is part of Reed Elsevier Group plc.

== Criticisms ==
The GRS as a rating scale has yet to be evaluated up to the level commonly accepted by major research associations (NCTM, AERA, APA). As such its use in gifted and talented identification at this point is questionable. Although the GRS is among the top-tier of such rating scales meant to be used for gifted and talented identification, it is also by far the most expensive.

The GRS assessment is controversial because, among other things, intellectually gifted children at the highest levels are often not "teacher pleasers" and can be misunderstood or evaluated with prejudice, especially by laypeople with no expertise in giftedness. Moreover, raters can't access, guess, or factor for certain likable or unlikable characteristics such as hyperactivity or inattention or aggressive/stubbornness.

Rating scales, in general, can be subject to rater bias based upon the characteristics of the rater. This is of particular concern for children being evaluated for kindergarten because the credentials of the raters from preschools greatly vary. Slight changes in the wording of instructions, or the wording of the items themselves, may have a significant effect on the child's response.

Data obtained from ratings rely totally on the rater's familiarity with the child. In practice, the rater of a preschooler, for example, may not be the same person that spends time with the child.

Rating scales, in general, are limited to the informant's perspective. Information that may be relevant to the subject, but that is not covered by the items of the scale will be missed. With rating scales, it is not possible to explore the informant's responses and subjective experiences, nor is it possible to observe behavior directly.

Because the GRS is administered by laypeople, critics aver that in a large school system, such as New York City, problems with measurement consistency can be tolerably contained within Regions; but it can be injurious to students wrongly admitted to more rigorous citywide schools for intellectually gifted.

In the case of the New York City public schools, the implementation of the GRS and the OLSAT, together, essentially represent a shift away from using IQ as the prime criteria for identifying special needs. It also removes the assessment duties from the erstwhile used tightly controlled NYC DOE process that uses pre-approved, independent child psychologists (who had, until 2007, administered the Stanford Binet), and gives most of the duties, instead, to a publishing company and laypeople.

IQ in the top 5% is difficult to accurately measure. The GRS is too new to have been adequately normed for acceptable accuracy at those levels.

Criteria, such as Leadership and Motivation, are often counter-correlated with high IQ, so the GRS might actually screen out children who most need special attention.

== Use of GRS in public education ==
- 2007-08 New York City Department of Education adopted the use of GRS as a one-third component for gaining admission to pre-K through 3 Gifted & Talented programs. The other two-thirds component was the OLSAT. This was the only year that the GRS was used. Beginning 2008–09, the DOE replaced the GRS with Bracken School Readiness Assessment and changed the BSRA/OLSAT weighting to 25/75.
- 2011-12 Atlanta Public School System adopted the use of GRS as a pre-qualitifiying process for automatic testing of students for the Gifted & Talented programs.

== Editions ==
3rd ed. — Gifted Rating Scales (GRS) (2003)

== See also ==
- Rating scale
