= NEPSY =

Series of neuropsychological tests

NEPSY ("A Developmental Neuropsychological Assessment") is a series of neuropsychological tests authored by Marit Korkman, Ursula Kirk and Sally Kemp, that is used in various combinations to assess neuropsychological development in children ages 3–16 years in six functional domains.

NEPSY was designed to assess both basic and complex aspects of cognition, critical to children’s ability to learn and be productive, in and outside of school settings. It is designed to test cognitive functions not typically covered by general ability or achievement batteries.

== History ==
Pediatric neuropsychological assessments evolved from knowledge and experience from the assessment of adults with brain damage. Consequently, early tests were not specifically designed with children in mind and were often normed on small samples of children. The development of the NEPSY was revolutionary as it was specifically designed for the purpose of testing children. The NEPSY is grounded in developmental and neuropsychological theory and practice. The diagnostic approach originated in the Lurian approach to assessment.

NEPSY-II is based on a Finnish instrument, NEPS, originally published in 1980. NEPS included two to five tasks, aimed at 5 to 6-year-olds and was then revised in 1988 and 1990 to include more tasks and be applicable for a wider age range (NEPSU). In 1990, a Swedish version was also developed (NEPSY), which was standardized in Finland and included an even wider age range. In 1998, the English version was published for the age range 3 to 12.

The original version of the NEPSY consisted of five theoretically derived domains: Attention and Executive Functioning, Language, Memory and Learning, Sensorimotor, and Visuospatial Processing. These domains were made up of a total of 25 subtests that would either provide an individual score or be part of the overall domain score. The NEPSY-II was published in 2007. One of the first changes of note was the increased age range, allowing for testing of children and adolescents from 3 to 16 years of age. The NEPSY-II test battery also added a new domain, Social Perception, and eleven new subtests in addition to removing four of the old subtests. The test battery thus consists of six domains comprising 32 subtests. The NEPSY-II also exists in two versions: one for ages 3 through 4 and one for ages 5 through 16. The creators also removed the option for domain scoring, a choice which is still hotly debated today.

== NEPSY-II ==
=== Domains ===
The six functional domains below are made up of 32 subtests and four delayed tasks. These domains are theoretically, not empirically, derived. The subtests were designed to assess cognitive abilities related to disorders that are typically diagnosed in childhood and that are required for success in an academic environment.

- Attention and Executive Functions– inhibition, self-regulation, monitoring, vigilance, selective and sustained attention, maintenance of response set, planning, flexibility in thinking and figural fluency. Subtests: Animal Sorting, Auditory Attention, Response Set, Clocks, Design Fluency, Inhibition & Statue.
- Language and Communication – phonological processing, receptive language, expressive naming, verbal fluency and rhythmic oral motor sequences. Subtests: Body Part Naming and Identification, Comprehension of Instructions, Oromotor Sequences, Phonological Processing, Repetition of Nonsense Words, Speeded Naming & Word Generation.
- Sensorimotor Functions – tactile sensory input, fine motor speed, imitative hand functions, rhythmic and sequential movements and visuomotor precision. Subtests: Fingertip Tapping, Imitating Hand Positions, Manual Motor Sequences & Visuomotor Precision.
- Visuospatial Functions – the ability to judge position and directionality, copying of 2-dimensional and the reconstruction of 3-dimensional designs. Subtests: Arrows, Block Construction, Design Copying, Geometric Puzzles, Picture Puzzles & Route Finding.
- Learning and Memory – memory for words, sentences and faces, immediate and delayed list learning, memory for names and narrative memory under free- and cued-recall conditions. Subtests: List Memory, Memory for Designs, Memory for Faces, Memory for Names, Narrative Memory, Sentence Repetition & Word List Interference.
- Social Perception (added in the NEPSY-II) – the ability to recognize emotions, to guess what another person is thinking and feeling and empathy. Subtests: Affect Recognition & Theory of Mind.

These tests supposedly help detect any underlying deficiencies that may impede a child's learning. Each NEPSY-II test is freestanding, though the results of all of the tests of the original NEPSY could be normed together to provide an overall standardized score for each of the domains. The overall score for each domain was dropped in NEPSY-II, because the diagnostic information is strongest at the subtest level and discrepancies can be washed out in computing a global score. This was especially true if the examiner reported only global scores.

A comprehensive neuropsychological evaluation can be completed using the full assessment but there is no required set of subtests that must be administered to every child. NEPSY can provide a brief evaluation across all six domains and in-depth assessment based on diagnostic concerns.

=== Testing time ===
General assessment takes 45 minutes for preschool ages and 1 hour for school ages, while a full assessment takes 90 minutes for preschool and 2 to 3 hours for school ages. Diagnostic and selective assessment time varies.

== Psychometric properties ==
Up-to-date psychometric norms are based on the standardization of over 1,000 children tested throughout the United States, which enables the comparison of a child's performance to others in the appropriate age group. Several special group studies are included in the NEPSY-II. These groups consisted of 260 children meeting the DSM-IV diagnostic criteria for a variety of disorders, including ADHD, reading disorders, language disorder, autism spectrum disorder, Asperger’s syndrome, deafness and hard hearing, emotional distortion, traumatic brain disorder, dyscalculia and mild intellectual disability.

Validity Studies were carried out with NEPSY, WISC-IV, DAS—II, WNV, WIAT—III, CMS, DKEFS, BBCS:3R, DSMD, ABAS—II, Brown ADD Scales and CCC-2.

== Limitations ==
Unlike other similar batteries (including the original NEPSY), NEPSY-II does not have index scores. Additionally, neither NEPSY nor NEPSY-II's memory subtests provide differentiation in standard scores between delayed free recall and delayed recognition, which limits its usability in certain clinical contexts.

The complexity and number of subtests make NEPSY difficult to master and comprehend. Administration may be time-consuming and the scores are difficult to interpret.

== Translations ==
NEPSY has been translated or adapted into a number of languages including: Dutch/Flemish, Finnish, French, Norwegian, Portuguese (Brazil), Romanian, Swedish and Italian.

== See also ==
- Tower of London Test
- Wechsler Intelligence Scale for Children
- Alexander Luria
- Pearson Assessment
- Neuropsychological assessment
