= Donald Brace =

- Born: December 27, 1881; West Winfield, New York, USA
- Died: September 20, 1955 (aged 73)
- Resting place: Meeting House Green Road Cemetery, West Winfield, New York
- Education: Columbia College of Columbia University
- Occupation: Publisher
- Known for: Being a co-founder of Harcourt Trade Publishers

Donald Clifford Brace (December 27, 1881, West Winfield, New York – September 20, 1955) was an American publisher and founder of the publishing company Harcourt, Brace & Howe in 1919.

Brace graduated from Columbia College of Columbia University in 1904 with fellow grad Alfred Harcourt, with whom he worked for Henry Holt and Company before founding Harcourt, Brace & Howe, along with editor Will David Howe. After Howe left the company in 1921, the partners changed the name to Harcourt, Brace & Company. They published the works of a number of writers who became internationally renowned, including Walter Lippmann, Sinclair Lewis, Virginia Woolf, T. S. Eliot, James Thurber, George Orwell, Valentine Davies and Robert Penn Warren. Firms acquired by Harcourt, Brace include Brewer, Warren and Putnam; and Reynal & Hitchcock.

== Awards and honors ==
- Donald C. Brace Memorial Lecture of the Copyright Society of the U.S.A., an annual lecture given in his name
