= Carol Field =

American cookbook author of Italian baking and cuisine

- Born: March 27, 1940
- Died: March 10, 2017 (aged 76); San Francisco, California, U.S.
- Occupations: author, librarian
- Spouse: John Field
- Children: Alison Field
- Parents: James D. Hart (father); Ruth Arnstein (mother)
- Awards: Knight of the Order of Merit

Carol Field (March 27, 1940 – March 10, 2017) was an American cookbook author, writer, and librarian. She is known for introducing Americans to the variety of Italian breads with her book The Italian Baker.

== Education ==
Born Carol Helen Hart in Oakland, California, to James D. Hart, head of the English department at the University of California, Berkeley and Ruth Arnstein. Field attended Anna Head School for Girls and Wellesley College, where she graduated with a bachelor's degree in English in 1961.

== Personal life ==
She married John Field, an architect who died in February 2017. Together, they had a son named Matt and a daughter, epidemiologist Alison Field.

== Career ==
Field worked as a librarian at the San Francisco Public Library. She opened Minerva's Owl bookstore with a partner in 1962.

After traveling with her husband to Italy, Field learned Italian and began to explore Italian cooking, though her first book, Hill Towns of Italy (1983), explored the history of towns in the Italian regions of Tuscany and Umbria. The Italian Baker was first published in 1985. A year later, the International Association of Culinary Professionals honored the work with an award. After it had gone out of print, a bookseller from New York told her "It's like not being able to find Jane Austen," and Field worked to republish her best known work, releasing it for a second time in 2011.

A prolific writer, she wrote for numerous publications including Gourmet and Bon Appétit. In 1994, Italy in Small Bites was named the winner of the Italian Book James Beard Foundation Award. Sixteen years later, The Italian Baker was designated one of the James Beard Foundation's Baker's Dozen, a collection of "indispensable baking books." Field was elected a foreign member of the Accademia Italiana della Cucina in 1993 and the government of Italy named Field a Knight of the Order of Merit in 2004.

== Selected works ==
- Field, Carol. Celebrating Italy. New York: Morrow, 1990. ISBN 0688070930 OCLC 260151454
- Field, Carol. Italy in Small Bites. New York: HarperCollins Publishers, 1993, 2004.
- Field, Carol, and Richard Kauffman. The Hill Towns of Italy. San Francisco, Chronicle Books, 1983, 1996. OCLC 681347079
- Field, Carol. In Nonna's Kitchen: Recipes and Traditions from Italy's Grandmothers. New York: HarperCollins, 2000. ISBN 0060171847
- Field, Carol. Focaccia: Simple Breads from the Italian Oven. San Francisco: Chronicle, 2003.
- Field, Carol. Mangoes And Quince. New York: Bloomsbury, 2001, 2008.
- Field, Carol. The Italian Baker, Revised; The Classic Tastes of the Italian Countryside--Its Breads, Pizza, Focaccia, Cakes, Pastries, and Cookies. Ten Speed Press, 2011.

== Death ==
She died of a stroke at home in San Francisco on March 10, 2017, aged 76.
