= Bancroft Library =

Primary special-collections library of the University of California, Berkeley

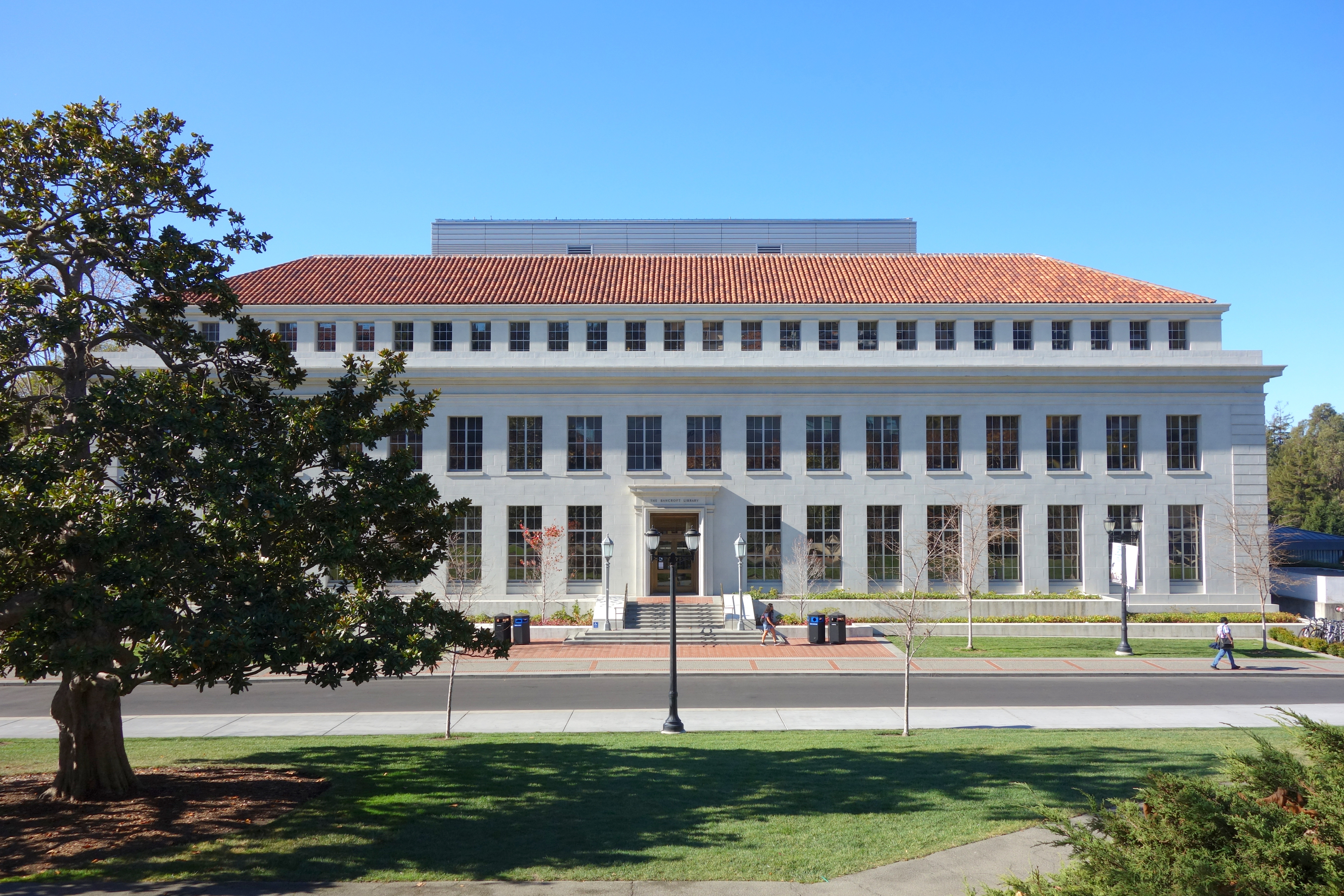
- Doe Annex, built in 1950
- 37°52′20″N 122°15′32″W
- Location: United States
- Established: 1859

The Bancroft Library is the main special collections library of the University of California, Berkeley. The original collection, acquired in 1905 from its founder Hubert Howe Bancroft, is the largest collection of materials on Californian history and Western North America in the world.

== Inception ==
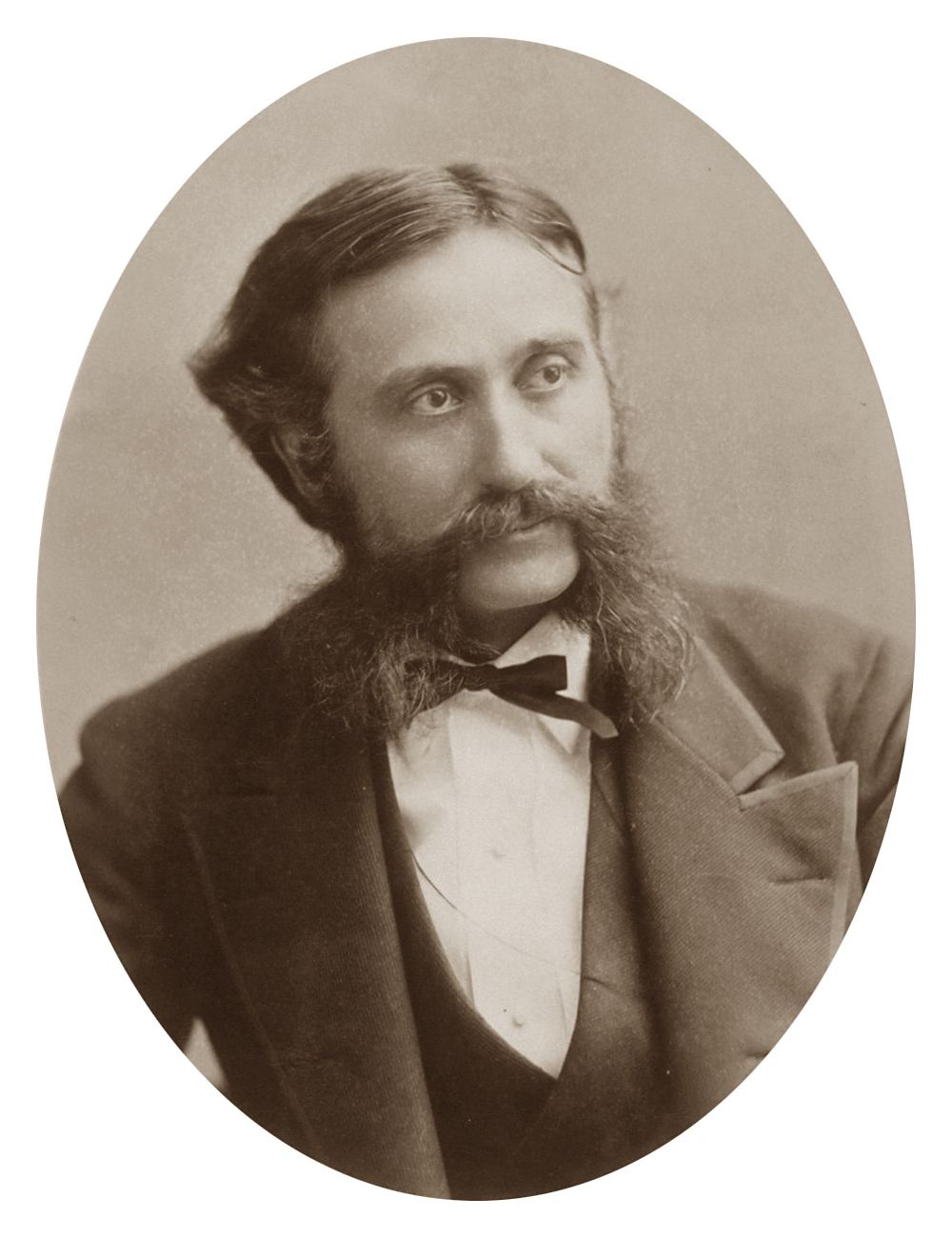
Hubert H. Bancroft, the library's founder and namesake

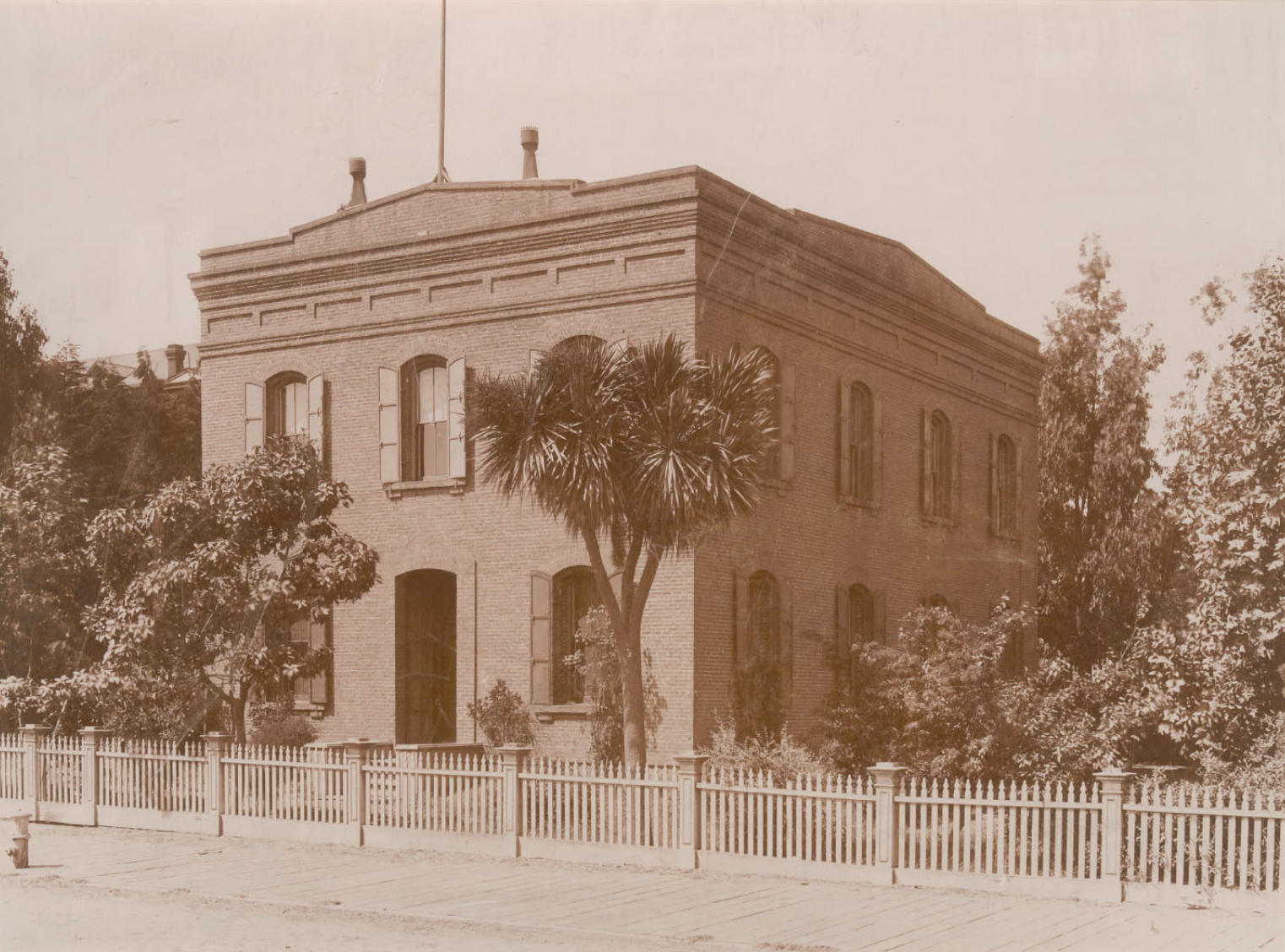
Bancroft Library (c. 1890) at 1538 Valencia Street

The Bancroft Library's inception dates back to 1859, when William H. Knight, who was then in Bancroft's service as editor of statistical works relative to the Pacific coast, was requested to clear the shelves around Bancroft's desk to receive every book in the store having reference to this country. Looking through his stock he was agreeably surprised to find some 50 or 75 volumes. There was no fixed purpose at this time to collect a library. Noticing accidentally some old pamphlets in an antiquarian book-store, he thought to add these to his nucleus; then looked more attentively through other stores and stalls in San Francisco, Sacramento, Portland and Victoria, purchasing a copy of every book relating to his great and growing subject. During his next visit to the eastern states, without special pains or search, he secured whatever fell under his observation in second-hand stores of New York, Boston and Philadelphia.

He had collected in all not far from a thousand volumes and had begun to feel satisfied. "When, however, (he declares) I visited London and Paris, and rummaged the enormous stocks of second-hand books in the hundreds of stores of that class, my eyes began to open. ... And so it was, when the collection had reached one thousand volumes, I fancied I had them all; when it had grown to 5,000, I saw it was but begun." (177) Finally, special journeys were made to all parts of Europe, as well as the Americas, in the interest of his collection. "And not only was every nook and corner of the world thus ramsacked, but whole libraries were purchased as opportunity offered." While his vague ideas of materials for writing a history gradually assumed more definite form, Bancroft had as yet no idea of writing a history himself. As the collecting proceeded his subject enlarged, until the territory covered was the entire western part of North America from Panama to Alaska, including the Rocky Mountain region, all Central America and Mexico, or about one-twelfth of the earth's entire surface.

The bibliophile reached the settled determination to make his collection as complete as it was possible to make it. Neither time, nor money, nor personal attention would be spared. Agents were appointed in all the leading book marts of the world; no book must be lost because of its high price; no opportunity was to be missed to obtain everything in existence on the subject. By buying up at auction in European cities' individual collections, and even libraries, the Bancroft Library was enriched beyond measure. In 1869, it is reported that Bancroft held, including pamphlets, about 16,000 volumes. These were lodged on the fifth floor of the Market Street building, the original home of the library having been a corner of the second story of the building on Merchant Street.

Bancroft now decided to begin literary work, but the collecting went rapidly forward without interruption. Trembling for the safety of the library through fear of fire, he lent a willing ear to his nephew's proposal to absorb the fifth floor for the purposes of the manufacturing department, of which he had charge. He would erect on some convenient spot a fireproof library building. Among the places considered were Oakland, San Rafael, Sonoma, San Mateo, and Menlo Park; but after a careful canvass and consideration, he selected the well-known site on Valencia Street, near its junction with Mission. The library was moved to the building October 9, 1881. There the library stood for years.

Most of the records of the Spanish and Mexican governments of what is now California (i.e., Las Californias and Alta California) which had been located by American government officials were lost to the fires after the 1906 San Francisco earthquake. Many of those records survive today only because Bancroft himself or his team of researchers made verbatim copies, or took down notes about their contents.

== State purchase ==
When the question of State purchase was taken up, the Bancroft Library was said to contain from 50,000 to 60,000 volumes of books, pamphlets, maps and manuscripts. Joseph Cummings Rowell, Librarian of the State University, after careful personal examination, estimated the number at 40,000 as a total. For many years, the collection had been offered for sale, Bancroft holding it at US$250,000, which is but a fractional part of the original cost and yet doubtless above the then market price, which Rowell estimated at $140,000, if the complete subject index be included. In 1887, a bill was presented in the State Legislature to purchase the library for the State for $250,000, but the proposition was quickly defeated. Some years later, the University of Chicago considered buying it; naturally there was strong sentiment against permitting the Library to be removed from California and the Pacific States.

In 1905, Reuben Gold Thwaites, Librarian of the State Historical Society of Wisconsin, and one of the foremost book experts in America, was invited to examine the Bancroft Library, "with a view to ascertaining its condition and, so far as may be, its marketable value." In his report, Thwaites characterized the collection of documents, manuscripts, books, pamphlets, and other materials, estimating the total value at upwards of $300,000. The report itself was published November 14, 1905, as a 20-page pamphlet.

The Report of the Secretary to the Regents of the University of California, year ending June 30, 1906, noted, "The Bancroft Library, incomparably superior to any other existing collection as a mine of primary historical material for all western America, a collection which could not even remotely be imitated, at no matter what cost, was acquired by the University on November 24, 1905, at a cost of $250,000. Of this amount Mr. H. H. Bancroft, whose ingenuity, perseverance and skill created this collection, donated $100,000. Of the remaining $150,000. $50,000 was paid by the Regents on November 24, 1905; $50,000 is to be paid November 24, 1906, and the remaining $50,000 in November 1907." Part of the sales agreement included a proviso that the collection retain the name Bancroft Library in perpetuity. On June 11. 1907, the regents of the University approved the Constitution of the Academy of Pacific Coast History, submitted by the Bancroft Library Commission, thus making the Library itself "the indispensable nucleus of a great research library, like that of the British Museum," which has for its object "the promotion of the study of the political, social, commercial, and the industrial history, and the ethnology, geography, and literature of the Pacific Coast of America, and the publication of monographs, historical documents, and other historical material relating thereto.

== Later history ==
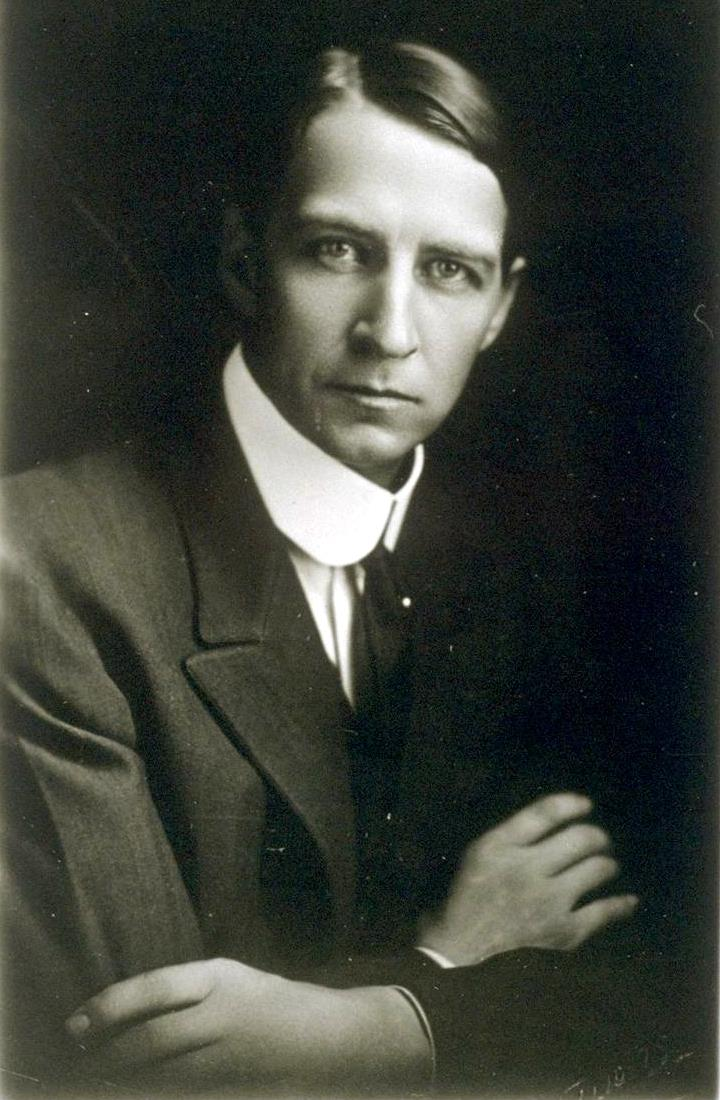
Herbert Eugene Bolton, founding director

The university named history chairperson Herbert E. Bolton its founding director, a position he held for the library's first 22 years. In his dual capacity, he made Bancroft Library a great research center for American history in congruence with the department's rise to prominence. Until the decade of the 1960s, The Bancroft Library continued to focus exclusively on the history of the American West, particularly the borderlands of northern Mexico and the southern United States, from Florida to California, an area associated with the research interests of long-time directors Bolton (1918–1940) and George P. Hammond (1946–1966).

In the 1950s and 1960s Bancroft added the University of California archives and the Regional Oral History Office, both significant to the history of California. In 1970, under new director James D. Hart (1970–1990), Bancroft's scope expanded dramatically when the University Library's Department of Rare Books and Special Collections was merged into it. These included the Tebtunis Archive of ancient papyri, excavated by an Egyptian expedition funded by Phoebe Apperson Hearst in 1899–1900 and the largest such collection in the Western Hemisphere; the papers of Mark Twain, the object of the Mark Twain Project, which since 1965 has been editing everything written by him; a large collection of medieval manuscripts, incunabula, and rare printed books from the sixteenth through nineteenth centuries; and the literary manuscripts of such California writers as Ina Coolbrith (California's first poet laureate), Jack London, Ambrose Bierce, George Sterling, William Randolph Hearst, Rube Goldberg, C. S. Forester, figures associated with the Beat Generation in San Francisco, such as Lawrence Ferlinghetti, Michael McClure, Philip Lamantia, Philip Whalen, and William Everson (Brother Antoninus), and contemporary authors such as John Mortimer, Seán Ó Faoláin, Maxine Hong Kingston and Joan Didion.

From June 2005 to October 2008, the library underwent a total renovation and seismic retrofitting. Normal operations have resumed since January 20, 2009. The library's director from 1995 through June 2011 was Charles B. Faulhaber, professor of medieval Spanish literature at Berkeley. In September 2011, Elaine Tennant, a medieval and early modern specialist in the German and Scandinavian departments at the University of California, Berkeley, became the James D. Hart Director of The Bancroft Library.

The university considered a proposal in 2023 change the library's name because "H. H. Bancroft held abhorrent Anglocentric and white-supremacist views that run counter to the University of California's most deeply held principles." Although ultimately deciding not to change the name, the university formed the Bancroft Library Reckoning Committee to deal with this legacy in other ways.

== Holdings and services ==
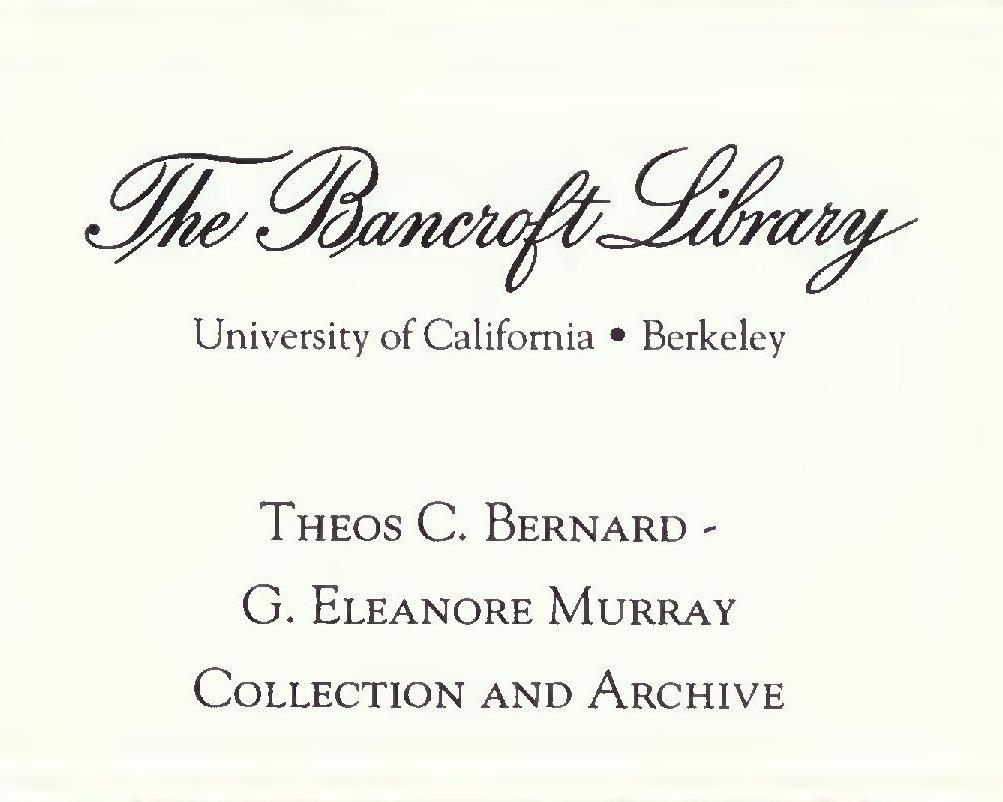
Theos C. Bernard – G. Eleanore Murray Collection and Archive bookplate provided by the California Digital Library

Bancroft is one of the largest special collections libraries in the United States. In 2019, it holds more than 600,000 books, 55,000 linear feet of archival and manuscript collections, almost eight million photographic prints and negatives (including the photographic morgues of the San Francisco Call-Bulletin and the San Francisco Examiner), and over 20,000 historical maps.

Although the library in general is open to the public, access to some of its more valuable materials is restricted to researchers with a demonstrated need. The library website and the Online Archive of California offer access to online catalogs as well as to numerous collections in digital form.

The library's Bancroft Gallery offers changing public exhibits from the library's collections, including art, photographs, documents, letters, architectural drawings, illustrations, newspaper clippings, ephemera, and oral histories. The library's publications include Bancroftiana, a newsletter published by the Friends of The Bancroft Library, and Keepsakes, a series of publications.

== See also ==
- Pony Express Bible
