= Alison Field =

American epidemiologist (1966–2024)

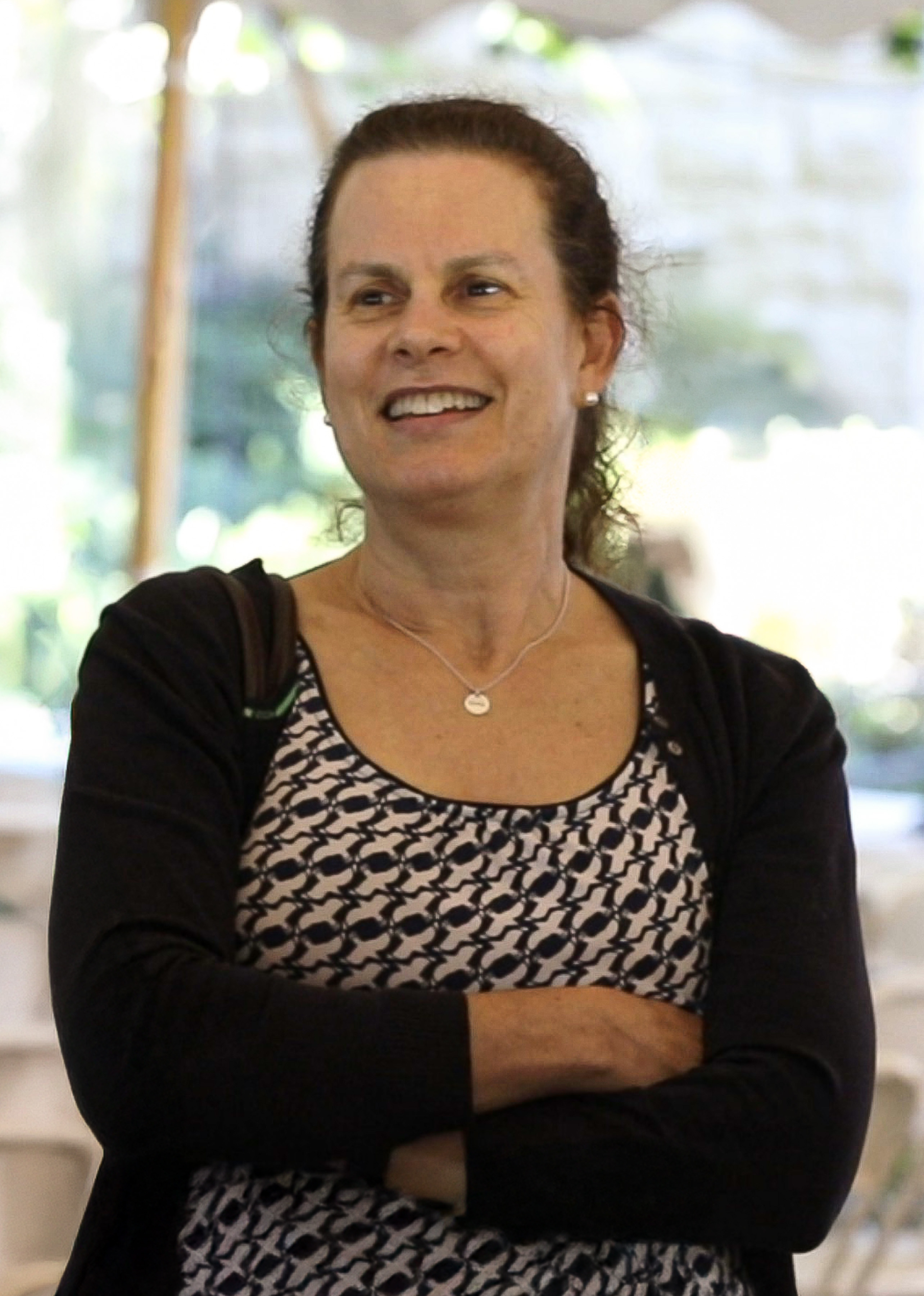
- Field in 2022
- Born: August 8, 1966; San Francisco, California, U.S.
- Died: October 10, 2024 (aged 58)
- Mother: Carol Field
- Relatives: James D. Hart (grandfather)

Academic background
- Education: BA, Psychology, University of California, Berkeley; ScD, Epidemiology, Harvard T.H. Chan School of Public Health
- Thesis: Empirical definitions of illness and outcome: An application to eating disorders (1995)

Academic work
- Institutions: Brown University; Harvard Medical School

Alison Ellen Field (August 8, 1966 – October 10, 2024) was an American epidemiologist. Field served as professor and chair of epidemiology at the Brown University School of Public Health and professor of pediatrics at Brown's Alpert Medical School.

== Early life and education ==
Field's mother was Carol Field, a novelist and author of books on Italian culture and food. Her father John Field was co-founder of the San Francisco architecture firm Field Paoli Architects.

Field earned her Bachelor of Arts degree in psychology from the University of California, Berkeley, and Doctor of Science in epidemiology from the Harvard T.H. Chan School of Public Health. While completing her post-doctoral fellowship at Harvard University in 1996, she helped launch the Growing Up Today Study (GUTS), a long-term study to inform eating disorder and obesity prevention and treatment.

== Career ==
Upon completing her ScD, Field joined the faculty at Boston Children's Hospital from 2002 until 2015 while simultaneously working at Harvard Medical School. While there, she continued to work on GUTS and found that frequent dieting among children ages 9 to 14 was both ineffective and harmful, as they gained weight long term in the future. Later, she found that children in the high normal weight range have an elevated risk of becoming overweight or obese as adults and boys with higher childhood BMI's were at greater risk for hypertension as they grew older. In 2008, Field led a study analyzing data of girls and boys between the ages of 9 and 15 from 1996 to 2003 to examine the association between various risk factors and the development of frequent binge eating, and purging. Along with a few other colleagues, Field also conducted a study that examined caloric intake versus weight reduction among preadolescent and adolescent girls, resulting in weight being the prevalent worry of this population.

As a result of her research into dieting and eating disorders, Field was a part of a working group who revised the eating disorder diagnostic criteria in 2013. She came to her conclusions using data from GUTS and the Avon Longitudinal Study of Parents and Children (ALSPAC) to best identify how eating disorders should be classified. In 2015, Field joined the faculty at Brown University. Fields held many leadership roles, such as chair of the Department of Epidemiology, director of the Center for Epidemiology and Environmental Health, and Associate Dean for Faculty Affairs. As a professor of epidemiology and pediatrics, Field led a study finding that children who engage in intense and long hours of activity per week were more likely to be injured.

== Death ==
Field died at home in Newton Center, MA on October 10, 2024, at the age of 58. She battled with brain cancer for three decades and succumbed to her glioblastoma brain tumor diagnosis.
