= The Oxford Companion to American Literature =

The Oxford Companion to American Literature by James D. Hart is one of the Oxford Companions series published by the Oxford University Press, Oxford and New York. The Concise Oxford Companion to American Literature, by James D. Hart (an abridged version of the 5th ed., 1983) was published in 1986.

Editions

- First, 1941
- Second, 1948
- Third, 1956
- Fourth, 1965
- Fifth, 1983 with revisions and additions by Phillip W. Leininger ISBN 0195030745
- Sixth, 12 October 1995, with revisions and additions by Phillip W. Leininger ISBN 0195065484
