= Stanford Achievement Test Series =

Assessment tests used in American schools

The Stanford Achievement Test Series, the most recent version of which is usually referred to simply as the "Stanford 10" or SAT-10, is a set of standardized achievement tests used by school districts in the United States and in American schools abroad for assessing children from kindergarten through high school. Millions of students have taken the test each year. First published in 1922, the test is now in its tenth version. It is produced by the publishing company Harcourt (now owned by Pearson), and should not be confused with the SAT college admission test published by the College Board. Although in many states it is being replaced by state-created tests (mandated by the No Child Left Behind Act of 2001), it is not equivalent to most of these tests in that the Stanford series are more comprehensive in scope than the newer assessments. The test is available in 13 levels that roughly correspond to the year in school, but the correspondence is not exact. (Precise comparisons between the Stanford test and state standards are difficult because the Stanford test materials are proprietary.) Each level of the test is broken into subtests or strands covering various subjects such as reading comprehension, mathematics problem-solving, language, spelling, listening comprehension, science, and social science.

The Stanford Achievement Test Series is used to measure academic knowledge of elementary and secondary school students. The reports include narrative summaries, process and cluster summaries, and graphic displays to clarify the student's performance and guide planning and analysis.

The Stanford 10 is one of the few tests in the United States which continues to use stanines to report scores.

In Florida public schools, the SAT-10 was at one point mandatory, but this requirement was dropped in 2009 as a cost-cutting measure. Some Floridian school administrators provoked controversy in 2016 by refusing to allow a third-grade student to advance to the fourth grade, despite the student's classroom performance, because the student had opted out of the SAT-10 and refused to take the state's own standardized test, the Florida Standards Assessment.

The SAT-10 is used in educational research to evaluate the effectiveness of policies, such as tying teacher salaries to students' test results.

A 1937 study found that the performance of male teenage delinquents on the then-current edition of the Stanford Achievement Test improved under the influence of benzedrine.
