= James D. Hart =

American literary scholar (1911–1990)

James D. Hart CBE
- Born: James David Hart; April 18, 1911; San Francisco, California, United States
- Died: July 23, 1990 (aged 79); Berkeley, California, United States
- Education: Stanford University; Harvard University
- Children: Carol Field
- Relatives: Alison Field (granddaughter)
- Scientific career
- Fields: American literature English literature
- Workplaces: University of California, Berkeley

James David Hart CBE (April 18, 1911 – July 23, 1990) was an American literary scholar, professor, and director of the Bancroft Library at University of California, Berkeley for fifty-four years. He is most notable for writing The Oxford Companion to American Literature and A Companion to California.

== Biography ==
Hart was born in San Francisco, California. He received a bachelor's degree from Stanford University, followed by a Ph.D. from Harvard University.

While studying for his doctorate at Harvard University, Hart conceived and began work on an American literature companion book. It is reported that in 1934, after looking for such a book among second-hand bookstores on what was Fourth Avenue below 14th Street in Manhattan, New York to no avail, Hart entered the offices of Oxford University Press on Fifth Avenue upon passing. Inside, on a whim, he told the receptionist that he had an idea for a book, which prompted editor Margaret Nicholson to come out to meet him. He questioned her about the existence of such a book, to which she replied, "We've been looking for someone to do that." She took him in to see director of the press Geoffrey Cumberlege. Cumberlege wanted to see examples of his work, and Hart had none. Furthermore, Cumberledge was sailing to Europe on the RMS Queen Mary the next day, so Hart returned to his hotel room and produced essays on Ralph Waldo Emerson and Richard Henry Dana amongst others, and delivered them to Cumberledge the next morning. A few months later he was granted a contract, and wrote the book alone. Critic Alfred Kazin said it is "the most valuable handbook I know on our literature," and had been on his desk for nearly half a century.

At the University of California, Berkeley, Hart served as chairman of the English department. He was also the university's vice chancellor from 1957 until 1960.

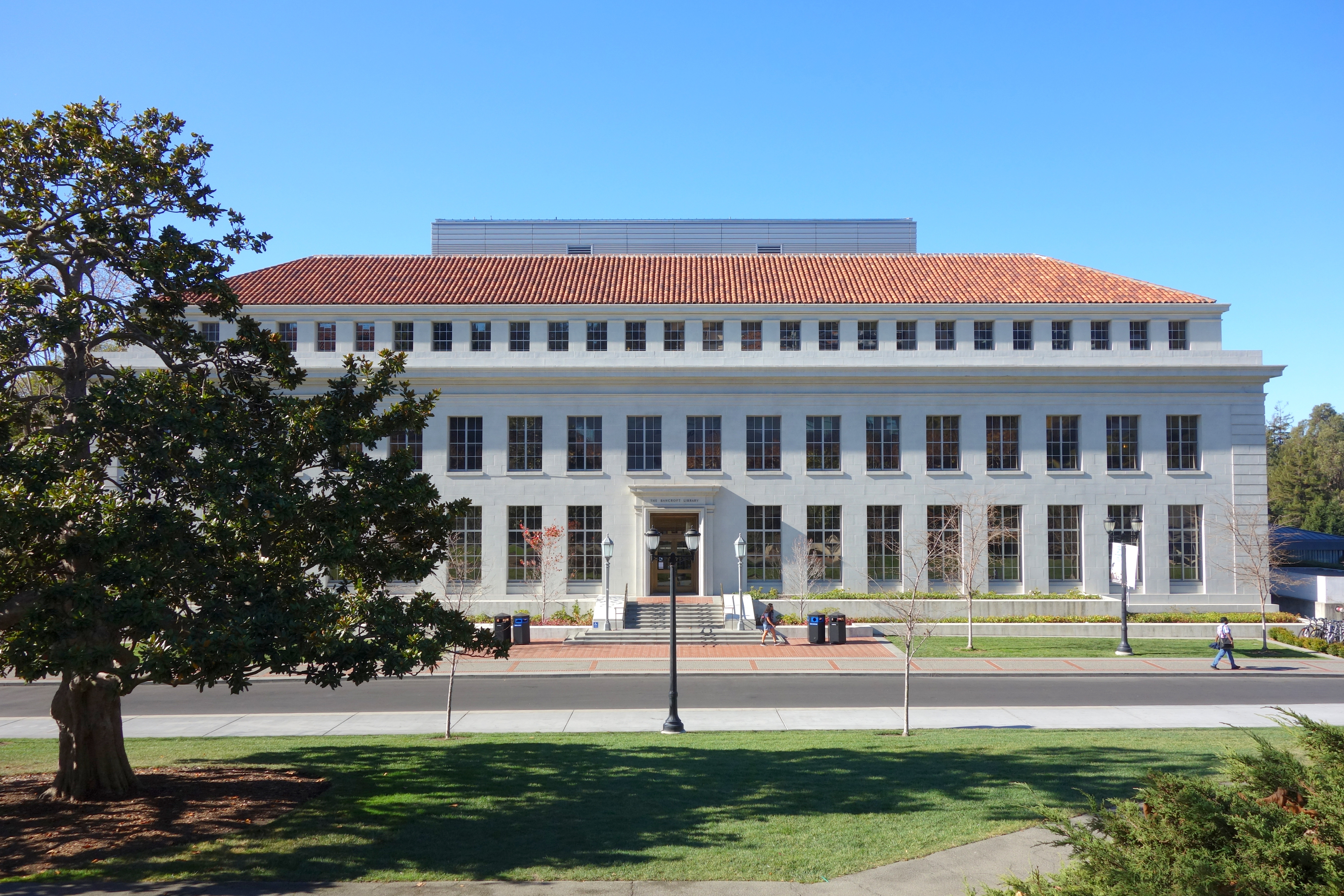
Hart was director of the Bancroft Library 1970-1990.

In 1969 he was appointed director of the University of California, Berkeley's Bancroft Library where he expanded the library's collection strategy. His tenure as director was honored in The Legacy of James D. Hart at the Bancroft Library, 1970-1990 which documented his leadership including acquisition of the Mark Twain papers.

He was a fellow of the American Academy of Arts and Sciences and of the American Antiquarian Society. He was a trustee of Mills College from 1970 until 1986, and was president of the board for three years. In 1963 he was appointed a CBE.

Hart died in his home in Berkeley, California on July 23, 1990, at the age of seventy-nine. His family reported that he had died of a brain tumor.

Hart has had articles published in American Heritage, American Literature and American Quarterly, as well as other general and scholarly journals. He also has published works on Robert Louis Stevenson, Frank Norris, Western history, popular writing and fine printing.

The 1981 reissue of Moby Dick by Herman Melville published by the University of California Press features an essay by Hart entitled A Note on the California Edition, where at the time he is credited as Director of The Bancroft Library.

== Family ==
He was married to Ruth Arnstein, a California native, born December 2, 1917. She died in Berkeley on December 4, 1977, Later, he married Constance Crowley Bowles. His daughter, the writer Carol Field, died of a stroke on March 10, 2017 at her home in San Francisco; his son, the pollster Peter Hart, lives in Washington D.C.. As of July 24, 1990, he has four grandchildren including epidemiologist Alison Field.

== Bibliography ==
- The Oxford Companion to American Literature
- The Concise Oxford Companion to American Literature. 1986
- A Companion to California, Oxford University Press, 1978. revised edition, UC Press, 1991
- The Popular Book: A History of America's Literary Taste (1950)
- From Scotland to Silverado by Robert Louis Stevenson (editor)
- Influences on California Printing (and Ritchie Ward)
- Fine Printing: The San Francisco Tradition
- Lawton Kennedy, Printer by Ruth Teiser (foreword)
- America's Literature (and Clarence Louis Frank Gohdes)
