= Harcourt (publisher) =

American publishing firm

- Traded as: NYSE: H
- Founded: 1919; 107 years ago
- Founder: Alfred Harcourt; Donald Brace
- Defunct: 2007
- Successor: Houghton Mifflin Harcourt
- Country of origin: United States
- Headquarters location: San Diego, California, U.S.
- Key people: William Jovanovich
- Publication types: Books

Harcourt, later Harcourt Brace Jovanovich, was an American publishing firm with a long history of publishing fiction and nonfiction for adults and children. The company was last based in San Diego, California, with editorial/sales/marketing/rights offices in New York City and Orlando, Florida, and was known at different stages in its history as Harcourt Brace, & Co. From 1919 to 1982, it was based in New York City.

Houghton Mifflin acquired Harcourt in 2007. It incorporated the Harcourt name to form Houghton Mifflin Harcourt. As of 2012, all Harcourt books that have been re-released are under the Houghton Mifflin Harcourt name. The Harcourt Children's Books division left the name intact on all of its books under that name as part of HMH.

In 2007, the U.S. Schools Education and Trade Publishing parts of Harcourt Education were sold by Reed Elsevier to Houghton Mifflin Riverdeep Group. Harcourt Assessment and Harcourt Education International were acquired by Pearson, the international education and information company, in January 2008.

== History ==
=== World Book Company (1905) ===
The first-created component of what would eventually become Harcourt was the World Book Company (unrelated to the Chicago-based World Book, Inc. publisher of reference works), which opened its first office in Manila in 1905 and published English-language educational materials for schools in the Philippines. The company later moved to New York City, where it became a test publisher. Much of the company's success was based on the work of Arthur S. Otis. He was best known for the intelligence tests he developed for the U.S. Army. Millions of World War I draftees took Otis tests.

World Book Company became the first publisher of group-administered tests measuring mental ability when it published Otis's Group Intelligence Scale in 1918. Otis became a World Book employee in 1921. By 1960, World Book had a portfolio of educational tests, including the Stanford Achievement Test (1923), the Metropolitan Achievement Test (1932) and the Otis Mental Ability Test (1936).

=== Harcourt, Brace & Howe (1919) and Harcourt, Brace & Company ===
Alfred Harcourt and Donald Brace were friends at Columbia College of Columbia University in New York, from which they both graduated in 1904. The two worked for Henry Holt and Company before founding their own publishing company in 1919, Harcourt, Brace & Howe, along with editor Will David Howe. After Howe left the company in 1921, the partners changed the name to Harcourt, Brace & Company. They published the works of a number of writers who became internationally renowned, including Walter Lippmann, Sinclair Lewis, Virginia Woolf, T. S. Eliot, James Thurber, George Orwell, Valentine Davies and Robert Penn Warren. Firms acquired by Harcourt, Brace include Brewer, Warren and Putnam; and Reynal & Hitchcock.

=== Harcourt, Brace & World (1960) and successors ===
Harcourt, Brace & World only existed between 1960 and 1970. The name Harcourt, Brace & World was used on books that were copyrighted as early as 1931, if not before. (Note: The name seems to be in flux in 1931 because the companion volume for the Johnson book uses the earlier name: Harcourt, Brace and Company.) By 1960, Harcourt Brace led the market in high school textbook publishing, but had little presence in the elementary school market. That year, William Jovanovich, who had become president of the company in 1954, took the company public and merged Harcourt Brace & Company with World Book Company to create Harcourt, Brace & World, Inc.

This strategic action improved the position of Harcourt Brace because World Book was an established elementary textbook publisher and test publisher.

In 1968, Harcourt, Brace & World entered the trade magazine business by acquiring Ojibway Press. In 1969, Harcourt acquired Academic Press.

==== Harcourt Brace Jovanovich ====
In 1970, the company was known as Harcourt Brace Jovanovich (HBJ), with William Jovanovich as chairman. That same year, the company acquired The Psychological Corporation. Under Jovanovich's leadership, the company diversified into non-publishing businesses such as insurance and business consulting. It also bought several theme parks—including SeaWorld, which it acquired in 1976 for $46 million.

Harcourt also published mass-market paperback books with Pyramid Books, which it bought out in 1974 and renamed Jove Books. It sold this section to the Putnam Berkley Group in 1979.

In 1985, HBJ merged in a stock trade with Cypress Gardens. Jim Monaghan sold Circus World for stock to Harcourt Brace Jovanovich on Tuesday, May 10, 1986, at 3:50 a.m. HBJ had a new idea for the park, and closed the park at opening time that day to rebuild it into Boardwalk and Baseball. HBJ Park Group opened SeaWorld San Antonio in 1988.

After an eight-year stint at Macmillan Publishing Company, Peter, William's son, joined Harcourt in 1980. In 1984, Peter was named head of the company's $400 million college textbook and professional division.

In 1987, days after a failed attempted takeover of HBJ, British publisher Robert Maxwell sued to stop the company from carrying out a $3 billion recapitalization plan. Eventually, the company divested its trade magazines to the buyout firm Kidder, Peabody & Co. in 1987. The company divested its theme park division in 1989 to Busch Entertainment for $1.1 billion, when they expected $1.5 billion, to meet its large debt.

In December 1989, Peter Jovanovich became chief executive officer of the company, replacing Ralph D. Caulo, who left after the theme park sale.

==== Harcourt General and Harcourt, Inc. ====
Harcourt Brace Jovanovich was acquired in 1991 for more than $1.5 billion by General Cinema Corporation, a diversified company that operated a national chain of movie theaters, and retailers such as Neiman Marcus and Bergdorf Goodman. In 1993 General Cinema Corporation renamed itself Harcourt General and restored the 1921 to 1960 name "Harcourt, Brace & Company" to its publishing division as Harcourt Brace (no comma). At the end of the year it divested its cinema division.

In 1994, Harcourt General acquired the religious imprint Brown-ROA from William C. Brown Company, a division of Times Mirror Company. It was renamed Harcourt Religion in 1999.

In 1995, Harcourt General acquired Assessment Systems, Inc., a professional test company.

In 1997, Harcourt General acquired National Education and Steck-Vaughn.

In 1998, Harcourt General acquired Morgan Kaufmann Publishers.

In 1999, Harcourt General divested its retail division and shortened the publishing division name to Harcourt, Inc.

==== Reed Elsevier Group plc ====
In 2001, the Anglo-Dutch publishing company Reed Elsevier acquired Harcourt, Inc. Harcourt Trade Publishers was a member of the Reed Elsevier Group plc (NYSE: RUK and ENL), a publisher and information provider operating in four global industry sectors: science and medical, legal, education, and business. As part of the deal, Reed Elsevier sold Harcourt's higher education division, and the NETglobal (formerly National Education Training), Assessment Systems, Inc (ASI), and Drake Beam Morin businesses to Thomson Corporation. Several parts of Harcourt (Academic Press, Morgan Kaufmann Publishers, and Saunders) were transferred to Elsevier and several parts of Elsevier (including Greenwood Publishing Group) were transferred to Harcourt Education.

In 2004, Harcourt acquired Saxon Publishers, publishers of Saxon math materials.

Reed Elsevier then comprised the following divisions: Elsevier (science and medical), LexisNexis (legal), Harcourt Education (education), and Reed Business (business).

==== Houghton Mifflin Riverdeep Group ====
On February 15, 2007, Reed Elsevier announced its intention to sell its education arm, Harcourt Education, of which Harcourt Trade Publishers was a part. According to Reed Chief Executive Crispin Davis, "This is essentially a strategic decision that we want to focus more sharply on our three existing businesses ... with better growth rates."

On July 17, 2007, Reed Elsevier announced that it had entered into a definitive agreement to sell its Harcourt U.S. Schools Education business, including Harcourt Trade Publishers, to Houghton Mifflin Riverdeep Group. The merger was completed and the Harcourt name ceased being used separately in 2008. Harcourt Religion was sold to Our Sunday Visitor in 2009. Houghton Mifflin Company acquired Harcourt in 2007, combining the Houghton Mifflin and Harcourt names to form Houghton Mifflin Harcourt.

== Products ==
Harcourt Trade Publishers published a wide range of books under a variety of imprints, including Harvest Books, Gulliver Books, Silver Whistle, Red Wagon Books, Harcourt Young Classics, Green Light Readers, Voyager Books/Libros Viajeros, Harcourt Paperbacks, Odyssey Classics, and Magic Carpet Books.

Harcourt's adult books division was one of the most historic of the American literary publishers. Its backlist included Sinclair Lewis, Virginia Woolf, T. S. Eliot, Robert Penn Warren's All the King's Men, and Alice Walker's The Color Purple. Harcourt also published high-quality literature in translation by acquiring European writers such as Günter Grass (Germany) and Umberto Eco (Italy).

Harcourt Children's Books published books for children of all ages, including interactive books for toddlers, picture books for young children, science fiction and fantasy novels for preteen and teens, as well as historical fiction. The house was the original publisher of such classics as Mary Poppins, The Borrowers, and Half Magic.

== Divisions of Harcourt ==
Harcourt School Publishers – U.S. elementary (pre-K–6) publisher with particular strength in the four major subject areas of science, reading, math and social studies.

Holt, Rinehart and Winston – U.S. secondary (grades 6–12) publisher with a leading position in literature and language arts, the largest middle and secondary school discipline. Holt also publishes in science, mathematics, social studies, and world languages.

Harcourt Brace Jovanovich acquired the educational arm of Holt, Rinehart and Winston, Saunders, and the Dryden Press in 1985 from CBS, and it retained the Holt, Rinehart and Winston name. CBS also sold in 1985 the other arm of the company, the retail publishing arm, to the Georg von Holtzbrinck Publishing Group based in Stuttgart, and it operated as a subsidiary publishing under its original name, Henry Holt and Company.

Harcourt Achieve, Professional and Trade – publishers of supplemental and alternative core educational materials for pre-Kindergarten to Grade 12 schools materials for adult education, school libraries and teacher professional development; and adult and children's trade books. Includes Harcourt Achieve, Greenwood/Heinemann, Global Library, Classroom Connect, Rigby, Steck-Vaughn, Harcourt Religion Publishers and Harcourt Trade Publishers.

Harcourt Assessment - develops tests and resources for educational, psychological, speech, and occupational therapy assessment, as well as human resource selection and hiring (talent assessment). Tests include WISC, WAIS, WPPSI, Raven's Progressive Matrices and Versant.

Harcourt Education International – publisher for the UK primary, secondary and vocational (further education) markets as well as English-medium schools worldwide. Also covers the Australasian primary, secondary and further education sectors. Its imprints include Heinemann, Rigby, Ginn, Payne-Gallway and Raintree.

HBJ Publications– business magazine and school supplies supplier that grew from sixteen magazines in the 1970s to more than one hundred by 1987. Executives from Harcourt bought the division in 1987 for $334 million.
