= Alfred Harcourt =

American publisher

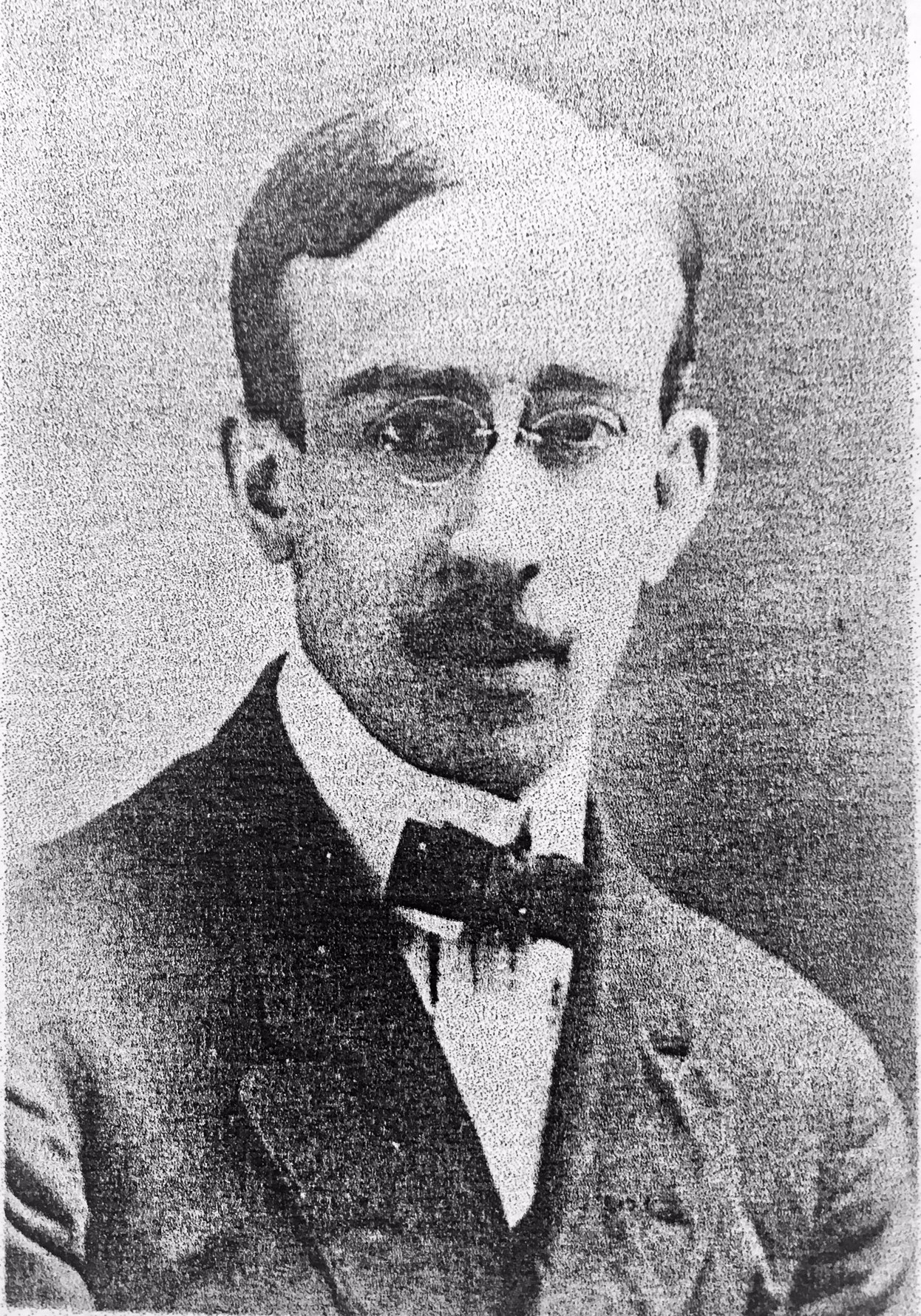
Alfred Harcourt, The Class of 1904, Columbia College.

Alfred Harcourt (/ˈhɑːrkɔːrt/; January 31, 1881 – June 20, 1954) was an American publisher and compiler who co-founded Harcourt, Brace & Howe in 1919.

== Biography ==
Harcourt was the son of Gertrude M. Elting and Charles M. Harcourt. Alfred was born in New Paltz, New York, to a fruit farmer and attended the New Paltz Normal School. While at the normal school Harcourt became a member of the Delphic Fraternity. An illness at age 9 led to his love for books and reading. After his studies at New Paltz, Harcourt attended Columbia University where he was an editor of the student newspaper, the Columbia Spectator and a member of the Philolexian Society.

Harcourt graduated from Columbia College of Columbia University in 1904 with fellow grad Donald Brace. The two joined Henry Holt and Company before founding Harcourt Brace and Company in 1919. Alfred Harcourt represented some of the most recognized writers of the time such as Robert Frost Sinclair Lewis, Carl Sandburg, George Orwell, Virginia Woolf, T.S. Eliot, and E.E. Cummings. Harcourt retired from his business due to poor health in 1942 and died in 1954 in Santa Barbara, California. He remained director of Harcourt Brace until his death.

Harcourt's second wife, Ellen Knowles, founded the Alfred Harcourt Foundation in 1962. She died in 1984.
