= Differential Ability Scales =

Set of cognitive and achievement tests for children

The Differential Ability Scales (DAS) is a nationally normed (in the US), and individually administered battery of cognitive and achievement tests. Into its second edition (DAS-II), the test can be administered to children ages 2 years 6 months to 17 years 11 months across a range of developmental levels.

The diagnostic subtests measure a variety of cognitive abilities including verbal and visual working memory, immediate and delayed recall, visual recognition and matching, processing and naming speed, phonological processing, and understanding of basic number concepts.

The original DAS was developed from the BAS British Ability Scales both by Colin D. Elliot and published by Harcourt Assessment in 1990.

== Test structure ==
The DAS-II consists of 20 cognitive subtests which include 17 subtests from the original DAS.

The subtests are grouped into the Early Years and School-Age cognitive batteries with subtests that are common to both batteries and those that are unique to each battery. These batteries provide the General Conceptual Ability score (GCA), which is a composite score focusing on reasoning and conceptual abilities.

Core cognitive tests	Diagnostic tests
Pattern construction	Recall of designs
Word definitions	Recognition of pictures
Similarities	Recall of objects
Matrices	Speed of information processing
Sequential & quantitative reasoning	
Recall of design	

Ages 6-17 only

=== Early Years Cognitive Battery ===
The Early Years core battery includes verbal, nonverbal, and spatial reasoning subtests appropriate for ages 2 years 6 months to 8 years 11 months.

There are three optional diagnostic subtests — Recall of Objects Immediate and Delayed, Recall of Digits Forward, and Recognition of Pictures. There are also two optional diagnostic clusters — working memory and processing speed.

=== School-Age Cognitive Battery ===
The School-Age core battery contains subtests that can be used to assess children ages 7 years to 17 years 11 months. These subtests measure verbal, nonverbal reasoning, and spatial reasoning abilities. The subtests can also be used to assess children ages 5 years to 6 years 11 months who may be cognitively gifted. In addition there are up to nine diagnostic subtests for this age group that feed into three possible diagnostic cluster scores — working memory, processing speed and, for the youngest ages, school readiness.

== Uses for assessing giftedness ==
Both DAS editions are suitable for evaluation of intellectual giftedness, and high scores are accepted as qualifying evidence for high IQ societies such as Intertel (min. GCA 135 on DAS-II) and American Mensa (min. GCA 130 on DAS-II).
