= Will D. Howe =

American educator and editor

Will David Howe (August 25, 1873 – December 6, 1946) was an American educator, editor, and nonfiction writer. He was born in Charlestown, Indiana. He taught English at Indiana University after receiving a bachelor's degree from Butler University, and master's and doctorate degrees from Harvard University.
