= Kaufman Assessment Battery for Children =

Psychological test for cognitive development

- Synonyms: KABC, K-ABC
- Purpose: assessing cognitive development in children

The Kaufman Assessment Battery for Children (KABC) is a clinical instrument (psychological diagnostic test) for assessing cognitive development. Its construction incorporates several recent developments in both psychological theory and statistical methodology. The test was developed by Alan S. Kaufman and Nadeen L. Kaufman in 1983 and revised in 2004. The test has been translated and adopted for many countries, such as the Japanese version of the K-ABC by the Japanese psychologists Tatsuya Matsubara, Kazuhiro Fujita, Hisao Maekawa, and Toshinori Ishikuma.

The KABC also gives special attention to certain emerging testing needs, such as use with handicapped groups, application to problems of learning disabilities, and appropriateness for cultural and linguistic minorities. The authors rightly caution, however, that success in meeting these special needs must be judged through practical use over time. They also point out that the KABC should not be regarded as "the complete test battery"; like any other test, it should be supplemented and corroborated by other instruments to meet individual needs, such as the Stanford–Binet, Wechsler Adult Intelligence Scale, Wechsler Intelligence Scale for Children, McCarthy scales, or neuropsychological tests.

== History ==
The original KABC was developed from neuropsychological theory, merging left brain-right brain research on cerebral specialisation (e.g., Sperry, 1968) with Luria's sequential simultaneous processing dichotomy (Luria, 1966) and work in cognitive psychology. The KABC focuses on the processes needed to solve problems rather than their content i.e. verbal vs. non verbal. The KABC was one of the first intelligence tests to be principally derived from strong theoretical basis and the first intelligence test to be based in neuropsychological theory (Reynolds & Kamphaus, 1997). An important feature of the KABC is that it yielded smaller than average score differences than was typical between African American and European American ethnic groups, making it particularly useful when assessing children of difference ethnicities.

The second edition (KABC-II) which was published in 2004, is an individually administered measure of the processing and cognitive abilities of children and adolescents aged 3–18. As with the original KABC, the KABC-II is a theory-based instrument. However the KABC-II differs in its conceptual framework and test structure. While the KABC is grounded in simultaneous/sequential processing approach the KABC-II incorporates two distinct theoretical models. The KABC-II is grounded in a dual theoretical foundation: the Cattell–Horn–Carroll (CHC) psychometric model of broad and narrow abilities and Luria's neuropsychological theory of processing.

There are a number of important revisions in the KABC-II:

- The age range has been widened, additional scales developed and the theoretical foundation expanded.
- Eight of the original 16 subtests can be found in the KABC-II and 10 new subtests have been introduced.
- Four subtests have been removed from the measurement of Simultaneous processing: Magic Window, Spatial Memory, Photo Series and Matrix Analogies.
- Three have been retained: Triangles, Face Recognition and Gestalt Closure and three new ones have been added: Conceptual Thinking, Block Counting and Rover.
- The Learning Ability scale is new as is the Planning Scale. The Knowledge scale is made up of two original subtests (Expressive Vocabulary and Riddles) and a new addition Verbal Knowledge.

With the KABC-II, the examiner can choose which theoretical model to follow. Typically the Cattell–Horn–Carroll model is useful for children from a mainstream cultural and language background. Or if Crystallized Ability would not be a fair indicator of the child's cognitive ability, examiners may choose the Luria model which excludes verbal ability.

== Test format ==
The KABC-II has 18 subtests of two types: core and supplementary. Before testing the examiner decides which model to follow: Luria or CHC. The subtests are grouped into 4 or 5 scales depended on the age and interpretive model chosen. Luria's model consists of four scales: Sequential Processing Scale, Simultaneous processing Scale, Learning Ability and Planning Ability. CHC model renames these: Short Term Memory (Gsm), Visual Processing (Gv), Long Term Storage and Retrieval (Glr) and Fluid Reasoning (Gf) plus an additional 5th scale Crystallised Ability (Gc).

KABC-II scales and their subtests include:

Simultaneous/Gv

- Triangles: the child assembles several foam triangles to match a picture.
- Face Recognition: the child looks a photographs of one or two faces for 5 seconds and then selects the correct face/faces shown in a difference pose from a selection.
- Block Counting: The child counts the number of blocks in a picture of a stack of blocks, some of the blocks are partially hidden.
- Conceptual Thinking: The child selects one picture from a set of 4 or 5 which does not belong with the set.
- Rover: The child moves a toy dog to a bone on a grid that contains several obstacles trying to find the quickest path to the bone.
- Gestalt Closure: The child mentally fills in the gaps in a partially completed inkblot drawing and names or describes the object/action depicted in the drawing.
- Pattern Reasoning (ages 5 and 6).
- Story Completion (ages 5 and 6).

Sequential/Gsm

- Word Order: The assessor reads the names of common objects, the child the touches a series of silhouettes of these objects in the same order they were read out in.
- Number Recall: The assessor reads a string of numbers and the child repeats the string in the same order. The strings range from 2 to 9 digits.
- Hand Movements: the child copies a series of taps the examiner makes on the table with the fist, palm or side of the hand.

Planning/Gf

- Pattern Reasoning (ages 7–18): the child is shown a series of stimulus that form a logical linear pattern with one stimulus missing. The child selects the missing stimulus from several options.
- Story Completion (ages 7–18): the child is shown a row of pictures that tell a story, some pictures are missing. The child selects several pictures from a selection that are needed to complete the story and places them in the correct location.

Learning/Glr

- Atlantis: the assessor teaches the child nonsense names for pictures of fish, shells and plants. The child then has to point to the correct picture when read out the nonsense name.
- Atlantis Delayed: the child repeats the Atlantis subtest 15–25 minutes later to demonstrate delayed recall.
- Rebus: the assessor teaches the child the word or concept associated with a rebus (drawing) and the child reads aloud phrases and sentences composed of these rebuses.
- Rebus Delayed: the child repeats the Rebus subtest 15–25 minutes later to demonstrate delayed recall of paired associates.

Knowledge(Gc) included in the CHC model only

- Riddles: the examiner says several characteristics of a concrete or abstract verbal concept, and the child has to point to it or name it.
- Expressive Vocabulary: measures the Childs ability to say the correct names of objects and illustrations.
- Verbal Knowledge: the child selects from an array for 6 pictures the one that corresponds to a vocabulary word or answers a general information question.

KABC-II yields two general intelligence composite scores: Mental Processing Index (MPI; Luria's model) and Fluid-Crystallised Index (FCI; CHC model). The Luria model takes 25–60 minutes to administer while the CHC model takes 30–75 minutes to administer depending on the child's age.

== Psychometric properties ==
The KABC-II was standardised between 2001 and 2003 on 3,025 3- to 18-year-olds in 39 states and the District of Columbia. The KABC-II is co normed with the KTEA-II (Kaufman & Kaufman, 2004b). Correlation studies have been completed with: KABC, WISC, WISC-III, WPPSI-III, KAIT, WJ-III COG, PIAT-R, WJ-III ACH and WIAT-II. Special group studies (clinical validity studies) included: those with Emotional Disturbances, ADHD, Autistic Disorder, Intellectual disability, Learning Disability (Written expression, Mathematics and Reading) and those classed as Gifted.

The internal consistency reliability coefficient for core and supplementary subtests demonstrate the KABC-II has good reliability. The median reliability for the 3-6 age band is .85 (range .69-.92) and .87 (range .74-.93) for 7–18. Retest reliabilities of the global scales ranged from 0.72 to 0.94 where retest stability increasing with age.

== Uses ==
The KABC-II helps to identify an individual's strengths and weaknesses in cognitive ability and mental processing. The information provided by the KABC-II can facilitate clinical and educational planning, treatment planning and placement decisions. As with most psychological assessments the utility can be improved when combined with other tools. High scores on some forms of the test are accepted for admission to high IQ societies such as Intertel or Australian Mensa.

== Translations ==
The approach to understanding intelligence with the most supported and published research over the longest period of time is based on psychometric testing. It is also by far the most widely used in practical settings. Intelligence quotient (IQ) tests include the Stanford–Binet, Raven's Progressive Matrices, the Wechsler Adult Intelligence Scale and the Kaufman Assessment Battery for Children. There are also psychometric tests that are not intended to measure intelligence itself but some closely related construct such as scholastic aptitude. In the United States examples include the SSAT, the SAT, the ACT, the GRE, the MCAT, the LSAT, and the GMAT.[1] Intelligence tests are widely used in educational,[18] business, and military settings because of their efficacy in predicting behavior. IQ and g (discussed in the next section) are correlated with many important social outcomes—individuals with low IQs are more likely to be divorced, have a child out of marriage, be incarcerated, and need long-term welfare support, while individuals with high IQs are associated with more years of education, higher status jobs and higher income.[19] Intelligence is significantly correlated with successful training and performance outcomes, and IQ/g is the single best predictor of successful job performance.[1][20]

== See also ==
- Wechsler Intelligence Scale for Children
- NEPSY
- Wechsler Individual Achievement Test
- Woodcock–Johnson Tests of Cognitive Abilities
- Cattell–Horn–Carroll theory
- Luria–Nebraska neuropsychological battery
- Fluid and crystallized intelligence
