= IQ classification =

Categorisation of people's intelligence based on IQ

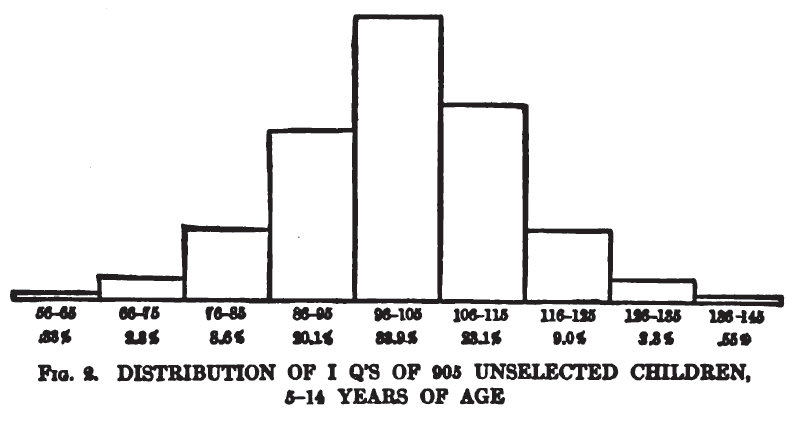
Score distribution chart for sample of 905 children tested on 1916 Stanford–Binet Test

IQ classification is the practice of categorizing human intelligence, as measured by intelligence quotient (IQ) tests, into categories such as "superior" and "average".

With the usual IQ scoring methods, an IQ score of 100 means that the test-taker's performance on the test is of average performance in the sample of test-takers of about the same age as was used to norm the test. An IQ score of 115 means performance one standard deviation above the mean, while a score of 85 means performance one standard deviation below the mean, and so on. This "deviation IQ" method is used for standard scoring of all IQ tests in large part because they allow a consistent definition of IQ for both children and adults. By the existing "deviation IQ" definition of IQ test standard scores, about two-thirds of all test-takers obtain scores from 85 to 115, and about 5 percent of the population scores above 125 (i.e. normal distribution).

When IQ testing was created, Lewis Terman and other early developers of IQ tests noticed that most child IQ scores come out to approximately the same number regardless of testing procedure. Variability in scores can occur when the same individual takes the same test more than once. Further, a minor divergence in scores can be observed when an individual takes tests provided by different publishers at the same age. There is no standard naming or definition scheme employed universally by all test publishers for IQ score classifications.

Even before IQ tests were invented, there were attempts to classify people into intelligence categories by observing their behavior in daily life. Those other forms of behavioral observation were historically important for validating classifications based primarily on IQ test scores. Some early intelligence classifications by IQ testing depended on the definition of "intelligence" used in a particular case. Contemporary IQ test publishers take into account reliability and error of estimation in the classification procedure.

== Differences in individual IQ classification ==
IQ scores can differ to some degree for the same person on different IQ tests, so a person does not always belong to the same IQ score range each time the person is tested (IQ score table data and pupil pseudonyms adapted from description of KABC-II norming study cited in Kaufman 2009).
Pupil	KABC-II	WISC-III	WJ-III
Asher	90	95	111
Brianna	125	110	105
Colin	100	93	101
Danica	116	127	118
Elpha	93	105	93
Fritz	106	105	105
Georgi	95	100	90
Hector	112	113	103
Imelda	104	96	97
Jose	101	99	86
Keoku	81	78	75
Leo	116	124	102

IQ tests generally are reliable enough that most people 10 years of age and older have similar IQ scores throughout life. Still, some individuals score very differently when taking the same test at different times or when taking more than one kind of IQ test at the same age. About 42% of children change their score by 5 or more points when re-tested.

For example, many children in the famous longitudinal Genetic Studies of Genius begun in 1921 by Lewis Terman showed declines in IQ as they grew up. Terman recruited school pupils based on referrals from teachers, and gave them his Stanford–Binet IQ test. Children with an IQ above 140 by that test were included in the study. There were 643 children in the main study group. When the students who could be contacted again (503 students) were retested at high school age, they were found to have dropped 9 IQ points on average in Stanford–Binet IQ. Some children dropped by 15 IQ points or by 25 points or more. Yet parents of those children thought that the children were still as bright as ever, or even brighter.

Because all IQ tests have error of measurement in the test-taker's IQ score, a test-giver should always inform the test-taker of the confidence interval around the score obtained on a given occasion of taking each test. IQ scores are ordinal scores and are not expressed in an interval measurement unit. Besides the reported error interval around IQ test scores, an IQ score could be misleading if a test-giver failed to follow standardized administration and scoring procedures. In cases of test-giver mistakes, the usual result is that tests are scored too leniently, giving the test-taker a higher IQ score than the test-taker's performance justifies. On the other hand, some test-givers demonstrate a "halo effect", with low-IQ individuals receiving IQ scores even lower than if standardized procedures were followed, while high-IQ individuals receive inflated IQ scores.

The categories of IQ vary between IQ test publishers as the category labels for IQ score ranges are specific to each brand of test. The test publishers do not have a uniform practice of labeling IQ score ranges, nor do they have a consistent practice of dividing up IQ score ranges into categories of the same size or with the same boundary scores. Thus psychologists should specify which test was given when reporting a test-taker's IQ category if not reporting the raw IQ score. Psychologists and IQ test authors recommend that psychologists adopt the terminology of each test publisher when reporting IQ score ranges.

IQ classifications from IQ testing are not the last word on how a test-taker will do in life, nor are they the only information to be considered for placement in school or job-training programs. There is still a dearth of information about how behavior differs between people with differing IQ scores. For placement in school programs, for medical diagnosis, and for career advising, factors other than IQ can be part of an individual assessment as well.

The lesson here is that classification systems are necessarily arbitrary and change at the whim of test authors, government bodies, or professional organizations. They are statistical concepts and do not correspond in any real sense to the specific capabilities of any particular person with a given IQ. The classification systems provide descriptive labels that may be useful for communication purposes in a case report or conference, and nothing more.

— Alan S. Kaufman and Elizabeth O. Lichtenberger, Assessing Adolescent and Adult Intelligence (2006)

== IQ classification tables ==
There are a variety of individually administered IQ tests in use. Not all report test results as "IQ", but most report a standard score with a mean score level of 100. When a test-taker scores higher or lower than the median score, the score is indicated as 15 standard score points higher or lower for each standard deviation difference higher or lower in the test-taker's performance on the test item content.

=== Wechsler Intelligence Scales ===
The Wechsler intelligence scales were developed from earlier intelligence scales by David Wechsler. David Wechsler, using the clinical and statistical skills he gained under Charles Spearman and as a World War I psychology examiner, crafted a series of intelligence tests. These eventually surpassed other such measures, becoming the most widely used and popular intelligence assessment tools for many years. The first Wechsler test published was the Wechsler–Bellevue Scale in 1939. The Wechsler IQ tests for children and for adults are the most frequently used individual IQ tests in the English-speaking world and in their translated versions are perhaps the most widely used IQ tests worldwide. The Wechsler tests have long been regarded as the "gold standard" in IQ testing. The Wechsler Adult Intelligence Scale—Fourth Edition (WAIS–IV) was published in 2008 by The Psychological Corporation. The Wechsler Intelligence Scale for Children—Fifth Edition (WISC–V) was published in 2014 by The Psychological Corporation, and the Wechsler Preschool and Primary Scale of Intelligence—Fourth Edition (WPPSI–IV) was published in 2012 by The Psychological Corporation. Like all contemporary IQ tests, the Wechsler tests report a "deviation IQ" as the standard score for the full-scale IQ, with the norming sample mean raw score defined as IQ 100 and a score one standard deviation higher defined as IQ 115 (and one deviation lower defined as IQ 85).

During the First World War in 1917, adult intelligence testing gained prominence as an instrument for assessing drafted soldiers in the United States. Robert Yerkes, an American psychologist, was assigned to devise psychometric tools to allocate recruits to different levels of military service, leading to the development of the Army Alpha and Army Beta group-based tests. The collective efforts of Binet, Simon, Terman, and Yerkes laid the groundwork for modern intelligence test series.

Wechsler (WAIS–IV, WPPSI–IV) IQ classification
IQ Range ("deviation IQ")	IQ Classification
130 and above	Very Superior
120–129	Superior
110–119	High Average
90–109	Average
80–89	Low Average
70–79	Borderline
69 and below	Extremely Low

Wechsler Intelligence Scale for Children–Fifth Edition (WISC-V) IQ classification
IQ Range ("deviation IQ")	IQ Classification
130 and above	Extremely High
120–129	Very High
110–119	High Average
90–109	Average
80–89	Low Average
70–79	Very Low
69 and below	Extremely Low

Psychologists have proposed alternative language for Wechsler IQ classifications. The term "borderline", which implies being very close to being intellectually disabled (defined as IQ under 70), is replaced in the alternative system by a term that doesn't imply a medical diagnosis.

Alternate Wechsler IQ Classifications (after Groth-Marnat 2009)
Corresponding IQ Range	Classifications	More value-neutral terms
130 and above	Very superior	Upper extreme
120–129	Superior	Well above average
110–119	High average	High average
90–109	Average	Average
80–89	Low average	Below average
70–79	Borderline	Well below average
69 and below	Extremely low	Lower extreme

=== Stanford–Binet Intelligence Scale Fifth Edition ===
The fifth edition of the Stanford–Binet scales (SB5) was developed by Gale H. Roid and published in 2003 by Riverside Publishing. Unlike scoring on previous versions of the Stanford–Binet test, SB5 IQ scoring is deviation scoring in which each standard deviation up or down from the norming sample median score is 15 points from the median score, IQ 100, just like the standard scoring on the Wechsler tests.

Stanford–Binet Fifth Edition (SB5) classification
IQ Range ("deviation IQ")	IQ Classification
140 and above	Very gifted or highly advanced
130–139	Gifted or very advanced
120–129	Superior
110–119	High average
90–109	Average
80–89	Low average
70–79	Borderline impaired or delayed
55–69	Mildly impaired or delayed
40–54	Moderately impaired or delayed
19-39	Profound mental retardation

=== Woodcock–Johnson Test of Cognitive Abilities ===
The Woodcock–Johnson a III NU Tests of Cognitive Abilities (WJ III NU) was developed by Richard W. Woodcock, Kevin S. McGrew and Nancy Mather and published in 2007 by Riverside. The WJ III classification terms are not applied.

Woodcock–Johnson R
IQ Score	WJ III Classification
131 and above	Very superior
121 to 130	Superior
111 to 120	High Average
90 to 110	Average
80 to 89	Low Average
70 to 79	Low
69 and below	Very Low

=== Kaufman Tests ===
The Kaufman Adolescent and Adult Intelligence Test was developed by Alan S. Kaufman and Nadeen L. Kaufman and published in 1993 by American Guidance Service. Kaufman test scores "are classified in a symmetrical, nonevaluative fashion", in other words the score ranges for classification are just as wide above the mean as below the mean, and the classification labels do not purport to assess individuals.

KAIT 1993 IQ classification
130 and above	Upper Extreme
120–129	Well Above Average
110–119	Above average
90–109	Average
80–89	Below Average
70–79	Well Below Average
69 and below	Lower Extreme

The Kaufman Assessment Battery for Children, Second Edition was developed by Alan S. Kaufman and Nadeen L. Kaufman and published in 2004 by American Guidance Service.

KABC-II 2004 Descriptive Categories
Range of Standard Scores	Name of Category
131–160	Upper Extreme
116–130	Above Average
85–115	Average Range
70–84	Below Average
40–69	Lower Extreme

=== Cognitive Assessment System ===
The Das-Naglieri Cognitive Assessment System test was developed by Jack Naglieri and J. P. Das and published in 1997 by Riverside.

Cognitive Assessment System 1997 full scale score classification
Standard Scores	Classification
130 and above	Very Superior
120–129	Superior
110–119	High Average
90–109	Average
80–89	Low Average
70–79	Below Average
69 and below	Well Below Average

=== Differential Ability Scales ===
The Differential Ability Scales Second Edition (DAS–II) was developed by Colin D. Elliott and published in 2007 by Psychological Corporation. The DAS-II is a test battery given individually to children, normed for children from ages two years and six months through seventeen years and eleven months. It was normed on 3,480 noninstitutionalized, English-speaking children in that age range. The DAS-II yields a General Conceptual Ability (GCA) score scaled like an IQ score with the mean standard score set at 100 and 15 standard score points for each standard deviation up or down from the mean. The lowest possible GCA score on DAS–II is 30, and the highest is 170.

DAS-II 2007 GCA classification
GCA	General Conceptual Ability Classification
≥ 130	Very high
120–129	High
110–119	Above average
90–109	Average
80–89	Below average
70–79	Low
≤ 69	Very low

=== Reynolds Intellectual Ability Scales ===
Reynolds Intellectual Ability Scales (RIAS) were developed by Cecil Reynolds and Randy Kamphaus. The RIAS was published in 2003 by Psychological Assessment Resources.

RIAS 2003 Scheme of Verbal Descriptors of Intelligence Test Performance
Intelligence test score range	Verbal descriptor
≥ 130	Significantly above average
120–129	Moderately above average
110–119	Above average
90–109	Average
80–89	Below average
70–79	Moderately below average
≤ 69	Significantly below average

== Historical IQ classification tables ==
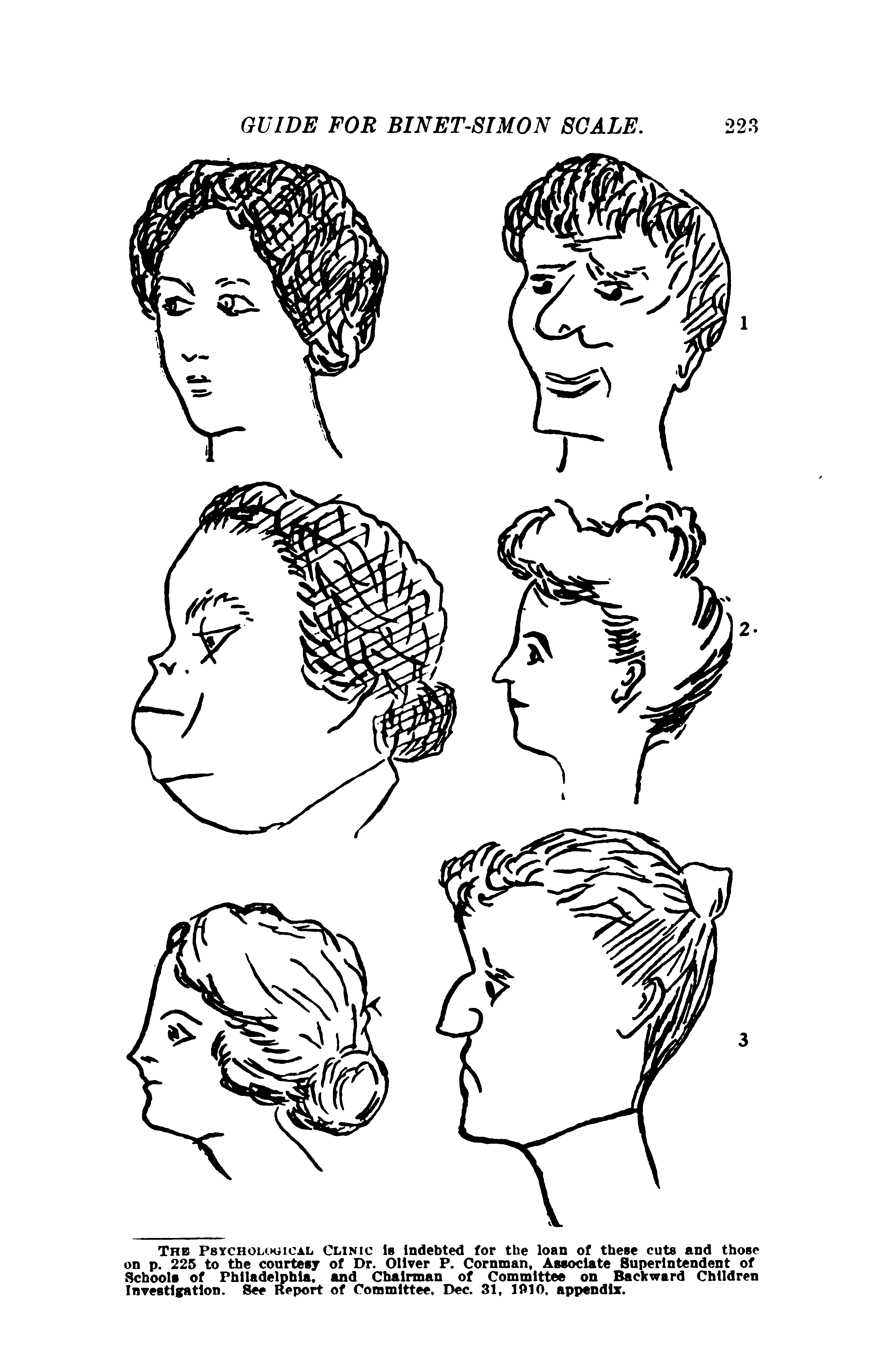
Reproduction of an item from the 1908 Binet–Simon intelligence scale, showing three pairs of pictures, about which the tested child was asked, "Which of these two faces is the prettier?" Reproduced from the article "A Practical Guide for Administering the Binet–Simon Scale for Measuring Intelligence" by J. E. Wallace Wallin in the December 1911 issue of the journal The Psychological Clinic (volume 5 number 7), public domain.

Lewis Terman, developer of the Stanford–Binet Intelligence Scales, based his English-language Stanford–Binet IQ test on the French-language Binet–Simon test developed by Alfred Binet. Terman believed his test measured the "general intelligence" construct advocated by Charles Spearman (1904). Terman differed from Binet in reporting scores on his test in the form of intelligence quotient ("mental age" divided by chronological age) scores after the 1912 suggestion of German psychologist William Stern. Terman chose the category names for score levels on the Stanford–Binet test. When he first chose classification for score levels, he relied partly on the usage of earlier authors who wrote, before the existence of IQ tests, on topics such as individuals unable to care for themselves in independent adult life. Terman's first version of the Stanford–Binet was based on norming samples that included only white, American-born subjects, mostly from California, Nevada, and Oregon.

Terman's Stanford–Binet original (1916) classification
IQ Range ("ratio IQ")	IQ Classification
Above 140	"Near" genius or genius
120–140	Very superior intelligence
110–120	Superior intelligence
90–110	Normal, or average, intelligence
80–90	Dullness, rarely classifiable as feeble-mindedness
70–80	Borderline deficiency, sometimes classifiable as dullness, often as feeble-mindedness
69 and below	Definite feeble-mindedness

Rudolph Pintner proposed a set of classification terms in his 1923 book Intelligence Testing: Methods and Results. Pintner commented that psychologists of his era, including Terman, went about "the measurement of an individual's general ability without waiting for an adequate psychological definition." Pintner retained these terms in the 1931 second edition of his book.

Pintner 1923 IQ classification
IQ Range ("ratio IQ")	IQ Classification
130 and above	Very Superior
120–129	Very Bright
110–119	Bright
90–109	Normal
80–89	Backward
70–79	Borderline

Albert Julius Levine and Louis Marks proposed a broader set of categories in their 1928 book Testing Intelligence and Achievement. Some of the entries came from contemporary terms for people with intellectual disability.

Levine and Marks 1928 IQ classification
IQ Range ("ratio IQ")	IQ Classification
175 and over	Precocious
150–174	Very superior
125–149	Superior
115–124	Very bright
105–114	Bright
95–104	Average
85–94	Dull
75–84	Borderline
50–74	Morons
25–49	Imbeciles
0–24	Idiots

The second revision (1937) of the Stanford–Binet test retained "quotient IQ" scoring, despite earlier criticism of that method of reporting IQ test standard scores. The term "genius" was no longer used for any IQ score range. The second revision was normed only on children and adolescents (no adults), and only "American-born white children".

Terman's Stanford–Binet Second Revision (1937) classification
IQ Range ("ratio IQ")	IQ Classification
140 and above	Very superior
120–139	Superior
110–119	High average
90–109	Normal or average
80–89	Low average
70–79	Borderline defective
69 and below	Mentally defective

A data table published later as part of the manual for the 1960 Third Revision (Form L-M) of the Stanford–Binet test reported score distributions from the 1937 second revision standardization group.

Score Distribution of Stanford–Binet 1937 Standardization Group
IQ Range ("ratio IQ")	Percent of Group
160–169	0.03
150–159	0.2
140–149	1.1
130–139	3.1
120–129	8.2
110–119	18.1
100–109	23.5
90–99	23.0
80–89	14.5
70–79	5.6
60–69	2.0
50–59	0.4
40–49	0.2
30–39	0.03

David Wechsler, developer of the Wechsler–Bellevue Scale of 1939 (which was later developed into the Wechsler Adult Intelligence Scale) popularized the use of "deviation IQs" as standard scores of IQ tests rather than the "quotient IQs" ("mental age" divided by "chronological age") then used for the Stanford–Binet test. He devoted a whole chapter in his book The Measurement of Adult Intelligence to the topic of IQ classification and proposed different category names from those used by Lewis Terman. Wechsler also criticized the practice of earlier authors who published IQ classification tables without specifying which IQ test was used to obtain the scores reported in the tables.

Wechsler–Bellevue 1939 IQ classification
IQ Range ("deviation IQ")	IQ Classification	Percent Included
128 and over	Very Superior	2.2
120–127	Superior	6.7
111–119	Bright Normal	16.1
91–110	Average	50.0
80–90	Dull normal	16.1
66–79	Borderline	6.7
65 and below	Defective	2.2

In 1958, Wechsler published another edition of his book Measurement and Appraisal of Adult Intelligence. He revised his chapter on the topic of IQ classification and commented that "mental age" scores were not a more valid way to score intelligence tests than IQ scores. He continued to use the same classification terms.

Wechsler Adult Intelligence Scales 1958 Classification
IQ Range ("deviation IQ")	IQ Classification	(Theoretical) Percent Included
128 and over	Very Superior	2.2
120–127	Superior	6.7
111–119	Bright Normal	16.1
91–110	Average	50.0
80–90	Dull normal	16.1
66–79	Borderline	6.7
65 and below	Defective	2.2

The third revision (Form L-M) in 1960 of the Stanford–Binet IQ test used the deviation scoring pioneered by David Wechsler. For rough comparability of scores between the second and third revision of the Stanford–Binet test, scoring table author Samuel Pinneau set 100 for the median standard score level and 16 standard score points for each standard deviation above or below that level. The highest score obtainable by direct look-up from the standard scoring tables (based on norms from the 1930s) was IQ 171 at various chronological ages from three years six months (with a test raw score "mental age" of six years and two months) up to age six years and three months (with a test raw score "mental age" of ten years and three months). The classification for Stanford–Binet L-M scores does not include terms such as "exceptionally gifted" and "profoundly gifted" in the test manual itself. David Freides, reviewing the Stanford–Binet Third Revision in 1970 for the Buros Seventh Mental Measurements Yearbook (published in 1972), commented that the test was obsolete by that year.

Terman's Stanford–Binet Third Revision (Form L-M) classification
IQ Range ("deviation IQ")	IQ Classification
140 and above	Very superior
120–139	Superior
110–119	High average
90–109	Normal or average
80–89	Low average
70–79	Borderline defective
69 and below	Mentally defective

The first edition of the Woodcock–Johnson Tests of Cognitive Abilities was published by Riverside in 1977. The classifications used by the WJ-R Cog were "modern in that they describe levels of performance as opposed to offering a diagnosis."

Woodcock–Johnson R
IQ Score	WJ-R Cog 1977 Classification
131 and above	Very superior
121 to 130	Superior
111 to 120	High Average
90 to 110	Average
80 to 89	Low Average
70 to 79	Low
69 and below	Very Low

The revised version of the Wechsler Adult Intelligence Scale (the WAIS-R) was developed by David Wechsler and published by Psychological Corporation in 1981. Wechsler changed a few of the boundaries for classification categories and a few of their names compared to the 1958 version of the test. The test's manual included information about how the actual percentage of people in the norming sample scoring at various levels compared to theoretical expectations.

Wechsler Adult Intelligence Scales 1981 Classification
IQ Range ("deviation IQ")	IQ Classification	Actual Percent Included	Theoretical Percent Included
130 and above	Very Superior	2.6	2.2
120–129	Superior	6.9	6.7
110–119	High Average	16.6	16.1
90–109	Average	49.1	50.0
80–89	Low Average	16.1	16.1
70–79	Borderline	6.4	6.7
69 and below	Mentally Retarded	2.3	2.2

The Kaufman Assessment Battery for Children (K-ABC) was developed by Alan S. Kaufman and Nadeen L. Kaufman and published in 1983 by American Guidance Service.

K-ABC 1983 Ability Classifications
Range of Standard Scores	Name of Category	Percent of Norm Sample	Theoretical Percent Included
130 and above	Upper Extreme	2.3	2.2
120–129	Well Above Average	7.4	6.7
110–119	Above Average	16.7	16.1
90–109	Average	49.5	50.0
80–89	Below Average	16.1	16.1
70–79	Well Below Average	6.1	6.7
69 and below	Lower Extreme	2.1	2.2

The fourth revision of the Stanford–Binet scales (S-B IV) was developed by Thorndike, Hagen, and Sattler and published by Riverside Publishing in 1986. It retained the deviation scoring of the third revision with each standard deviation from the mean being defined as a 16 IQ point difference. The S-B IV adopted new classification terminology. After this test was published, psychologist Nathan Brody lamented that IQ tests had still not caught up with advances in research on human intelligence during the twentieth century.

Stanford–Binet Intelligence Scale, Fourth Edition (S-B IV) 1986 classification
IQ Range ("deviation IQ")	IQ Classification
132 and above	Very superior
121–131	Superior
111–120	High average
89–110	Average
79–88	Low average
68–78	Slow learner
67 or below	Mentally retarded

The third edition of the Wechsler Adult Intelligence Scale (WAIS-III) used different classification terminology from the earliest versions of Wechsler tests.

Wechsler (WAIS–III) 1997 IQ test classification
IQ Range ("deviation IQ")	IQ Classification
130 and above	Very superior
120–129	Superior
110–119	High average
90–109	Average
80–89	Low average
70–79	Borderline
69 and below	Extremely low

== Classification of low IQ ==
The earliest terms for classifying individuals of low intelligence were medical or legal terms that preceded the development of IQ testing. The legal system recognized a concept of some individuals being so cognitively impaired that they were not responsible for criminal behavior. Medical doctors sometimes encountered adult patients who could not live independently, being unable to take care of their own daily living needs. Various terms were used to attempt to classify individuals with varying degrees of intellectual disability. Many of the earliest terms are now considered extremely offensive.

In modern medical diagnosis, IQ scores alone are not conclusive for a finding of intellectual disability. Recently adopted diagnostic standards place the major emphasis on the adaptive behavior of each individual, with IQ score a factor in diagnosis in addition to adaptive behavior scales. Some advocate for no category of intellectual disability to be defined primarily by IQ scores. Psychologists point out that evidence from IQ testing should always be used with other assessment evidence in mind: "In the end, any and all interpretations of test performance gain diagnostic meaning when they are corroborated by other data sources and when they are empirically or logically related to the area or areas of difficulty specified in the referral."

In the United States, the Supreme Court ruled in the case Atkins v. Virginia, 536 U.S. 304 (2002) that states could not impose capital punishment on people with "mental retardation", defined in subsequent cases as people with IQ scores below 70. This legal standard continues to be actively litigated in capital cases.

=== Historical ===
Historically, terms for intellectual disability eventually became perceived as an insult, in a process commonly known as the euphemism treadmill. The terms mental retardation and mentally retarded became popular in the middle of the 20th century to replace the previous set of terms, which included "imbecile", "idiot", "feeble-minded", and "moron", among others. By the end of the 20th century, retardation and retard became widely seen as disparaging and politically incorrect, although they are still used in some clinical contexts.

The long-defunct American Association for the Study of the Feeble-minded divided adults with intellectual deficits into three categories in 1916: Idiot indicated the greatest degree of intellectual disability in which a person's mental age is below three years. Imbecile indicated an intellectual disability less severe than idiocy and a mental age between three and seven years. Moron was defined as someone a mental age between eight and twelve. Alternative definitions of these terms based on IQ were also used.

Mongolism and Mongoloid idiot were terms used to identify someone with Down syndrome, as the doctor who first described the syndrome, John Langdon Down, believed that children with Down syndrome shared facial similarities with the now-obsolete category of "Mongolian race". The Mongolian People's Republic requested that the medical community cease the use of the term; in 1960, the World Health Organization agreed the term should cease being used.

Retarded comes from the Latin retardare, 'to make slow, delay, keep back, or hinder', so mental retardation meant the same as mentally delayed. The first record of retarded in relation to being mentally slow was in 1895. The term mentally retarded was used to replace terms like idiot, moron, and imbecile because retarded was not then a derogatory term. By the 1960s, however, the term had taken on a partially derogatory meaning. The noun retard is particularly seen as pejorative; a BBC survey in 2003 ranked it as the most offensive disability-related word. The terms mentally retarded and mental retardation are still fairly common, but organizations such as the Special Olympics and Best Buddies are striving to eliminate their use and often refer to retard and its variants as the "r-word". These efforts resulted in U.S. federal legislation, known as Rosa's Law, which replaced the term mentally retarded with the term intellectual disability in federal law.

=== Levels of intellectual disability ===
Over time, IQ scores have been varyingly used to diagnose severity levels of intellectual disability: mild, moderate, severe, and profound. Under the DSM-I and DSM-II, approximate IQ ranges were given, but both IQ test scores and level of functioning were to be used to diagnose a severity of intellectual disability (then called "mental deficiency" and "mental retardation" in the DSM-I and DSM-II respectively). The DSM-III and DSM-IV gave IQ ranges to use to classify severity levels of mental retardation but did not mention level of functioning as another criterion, although the DSM-IV had overlaps between the IQ ranges for severity levels, allowing clinical discretion for individuals scoring within those ranges.

IQ ranges for mental retardation severity levels in the DSM-IV
Severity level	Minimum IQ range	Maximum IQ range
Mild	50–55	Approx. 70
Moderate	35–40	50–55
Severe	20–25	35–40
Profound		20–25

Under the DSM-V, however, a severity level of intellectual disability is to be diagnosed based solely on adaptive functioning, without using an IQ score as a criterion. The manual explains that this is because adaptive functioning, not IQ scores, is what determines the amount of support needed, and also notes lower validity of IQ tests in the lower range. For example, floor effects make distinguishing between severe and profound intellectual disability solely based on IQ score difficult.

== Classification of high IQ ==
=== Genius ===
Galton in his later years

Francis Galton (1822–1911) was a pioneer in investigating both eminent human achievement and mental testing. In his book Hereditary Genius, written before the development of IQ testing, he proposed that hereditary influences on eminent achievement are strong, and that eminence is rare in the general population. Lewis Terman chose "'near' genius or genius" as the classification label for the highest classification on his 1916 version of the Stanford–Binet test. By 1926, Terman began publishing about a longitudinal study of California schoolchildren who were referred for IQ testing by their schoolteachers, called Genetic Studies of Genius, which he conducted for the rest of his life. Catherine M. Cox, a colleague of Terman's, wrote a whole book, The Early Mental Traits of 300 Geniuses, published as volume 2 of The Genetic Studies of Genius book series, in which she analyzed biographical data about historic geniuses. Although her estimates of childhood IQ scores of historical figures who never took IQ tests have been criticized on methodological grounds, Cox's study was thorough in finding out what else matters besides IQ in becoming a genius. By the 1937 second revision of the Stanford–Binet test, Terman no longer used the term "genius" as an IQ classification, nor has any subsequent IQ test. In 1939, Wechsler wrote "we are rather hesitant about calling a person a genius on the basis of a single intelligence test score."

The Terman longitudinal study in California eventually provided historical evidence on how genius is related to IQ scores. Many California pupils were recommended for the study by schoolteachers. Two pupils who were tested but rejected for inclusion in the study because their IQ scores were too low, grew up to be Nobel Prize winners in physics: William Shockley and Luis Walter Alvarez. Based on the historical findings of the Terman study and on biographical examples such as Richard Feynman, who had an IQ of 125 and went on to win the Nobel Prize in physics and become widely known as a genius, the view of psychologists and other scholars of genius is that a minimum IQ, about 125, is strictly necessary for genius, but that IQ is sufficient for the development of genius only when combined with the other influences identified by Cox's biographical study: an opportunity for talent development along with the characteristics of drive and persistence. Charles Spearman, bearing in mind the influential theory that he originated—that intelligence comprises both a "general factor" and "special factors" more specific to particular mental tasks—wrote in 1927, "Every normal man, woman, and child is, then, a genius at something, as well as an idiot at something."

=== Giftedness ===
A major point of consensus among all scholars of intellectual giftedness is that there is no generally agreed upon definition of giftedness. Although there is no scholarly agreement about identifying gifted learners, there is a de facto reliance on IQ scores for identifying participants in school gifted education programs. In practice, many school districts in the United States use an IQ score of 130, including roughly the upper 2 to 3 percent of the national population as a cut-off score for inclusion in school gifted programs.

Five levels of giftedness have been suggested to differentiate the vast difference in abilities that exists between children on varying ends of the gifted spectrum. Although there is no strong consensus on the validity of these quantifiers, they are accepted by many experts of gifted children.

Levels of Giftedness (M.U. Gross)
Classification	IQ Range	σ	Prevalence
Mildly gifted	115–129	+1.00–+1.99	1:6–1:44
Moderately gifted	130–144	+2.00–+2.99	1:44–1:1,000
Highly gifted	145–159	+3.00–+3.99	1:1,000–1:10,000
Exceptionally gifted	160–179	+4.00–+5.33	1:10,000–1:1,000,000
Profoundly gifted	180–	+5.33–	< 1:1,000,000

As long ago as 1937, Lewis Terman pointed out that error of estimation in IQ scoring increases as IQ score increases, so that there is less and less certainty about assigning a test-taker to one band of scores or another as one looks at higher bands. Modern IQ tests also have large error bands for high IQ scores. As an underlying reality, such distinctions as those between "exceptionally gifted" and "profoundly gifted" have never been well established. All longitudinal studies of IQ have shown that test-takers can bounce up and down in score, and thus switch up and down in rank order as compared to one another, over the course of childhood. IQ classification categories such as "profoundly gifted" are those based on the obsolete Stanford–Binet Third Revision (Form L-M) test. The highest reported standard score for most IQ tests is IQ 160, approximately the 99.997th percentile. IQ scores above this level have wider error ranges as there are fewer normative cases at this level of intelligence. Moreover, there has never been any validation of the Stanford–Binet L-M on adult populations, and there is no trace of such terminology in the writings of Lewis Terman. Although two contemporary tests attempt to provide "extended norms" that allow for classification of different levels of giftedness, those norms are not based on well validated data.

== See also ==
- Cattell–Horn–Carroll theory
- Creativity and intelligence
- Dyscalculia
- Dysgraphia
- Educational psychology
- Evolution of human intelligence
- Fluid and crystallized intelligence
- Heritability of IQ
- High-IQ society
- Learning disability
- Psychometrics
- Savant syndrome
- Spearman's hypothesis
- Standardized test

== Bibliography ==
- Aiken, Lewis (1979). Psychological Testing and Assessment (Third ed.). Boston: Allyn and Bacon. ISBN 978-0-205-06613-1.
- American Psychiatric Association (2013). Diagnostic and Statistical Manual of Mental Disorders (Fifth ed.). Arlington, VA: American Psychiatric Publishing. ISBN 978-0-89042-555-8.
- Anastasi, Anne; Urbina, Susana (1997). Psychological Testing (Seventh ed.). Upper Saddle River (NJ): Prentice Hall. ISBN 978-0-02-303085-7.
- Campbell, Jonathan M. (2006). "Chapter 3: Mental Retardation/Intellectual Disability". In Campbell, Jonathan M.; Kamphaus, Randy W. (eds.). Psychodiagnostic Assessment of Children: Dimensional and Categorical Approaches. Hoboken (NJ): Wiley. ISBN 978-0-471-21219-5.
- Cox, Catherine M. (1926). The Early Mental Traits of 300 Geniuses. Genetic Studies of Genius Volume 2. Stanford (CA): Stanford University Press.
- Dumont, Ron; Willis, John O.; Elliot, Colin D. (2009). Essentials of DAS-II® Assessment. Hoboken, NJ: Wiley. p. 126. ISBN 978-0-470-22520-2.
- Dumont, Ron; Willis, John O. (2013). "Range of DAS Subtest Scaled Scores". Dumont Willis. Archived from the original on 7 April 2014.
- Eysenck, Hans (1995). Genius: The Natural History of Creativity. Problems in the Behavioural Sciences No. 12. Cambridge: Cambridge University Press. ISBN 978-0-521-48508-1.
- Eysenck, Hans (1998). Intelligence: A New Look. New Brunswick (NJ): Transaction Publishers. ISBN 978-0-7658-0707-6.
- Flanagan, Dawn P.; Harrison, Patti L., eds. (2012). Contemporary Intellectual Assessment: Theories, tests, and issues (Third ed.). New York (NY): Guilford Press. ISBN 978-1-60918-995-2.
- Flanagan, Dawn P.; Kaufman, Alan S. (2009). Essentials of WISC-IV Assessment. Essentials of Psychological Assessment (2nd ed.). Hoboken (NJ): Wiley. ISBN 978-0-470-18915-3.
- Flynn, James R. (2012). Are We Getting Smarter? Rising IQ in the Twenty-First Century. Cambridge: Cambridge University Press. ISBN 978-1-107-60917-4.
- Foote, William E. (2007). "Chapter 17: Evaluations of Individuals for Disability in Insurance and Social Security Contexts". In Jackson, Rebecca (ed.). Learning Forensic Assessment. International Perspectives on Forensic Mental Health. New York: Routledge. pp. 449–480. ISBN 978-0-8058-5923-2.
- Freides, David (1972). "Review of Stanford–Binet Intelligence Scale, Third Revision". In Oscar Buros (ed.). Seventh Mental Measurements Yearbook. Highland Park (NJ): Gryphon Press. pp. 772–773.
- Gallagher, Sherri L.; Sullivan, Amanda L. (2011). "Chapter 30: Kaufman Assessment Battery for Children, Second Edition". In Davis, Andrew (ed.). Handbook of Pediatric Neuropsychology. New York: Springer Publishing. pp. 343–352. ISBN 978-0-8261-0629-2.
- Georgas, James; Weiss, Lawrence; van de Vijver, Fons; Saklofske, Donald (2003). "Preface". In Georgas, James; Weiss, Lawrence; van de Vijver, Fons; Saklofske, Donald (eds.). Culture and Children's Intelligence: Cross-Cultural Analysis of the WISC-III. San Diego (CA): Academic Press. pp. xvx–xxxii. ISBN 978-0-12-280055-9.
- Gleick, James (2011). Genius: The Life and Science of Richard Feynman (ebook ed.). Open Road Media. ISBN 978-1-4532-1043-7.
- Gottfredson, Linda S. (2009). "Chapter 1: Logical Fallacies Used to Dismiss the Evidence on Intelligence Testing". In Phelps, Richard F. (ed.). Correcting Fallacies about Educational and Psychological Testing. Washington (DC): American Psychological Association. ISBN 978-1-4338-0392-5.
- Gregory, Robert J. (1995). "Classification of Intelligence". In Sternberg, Robert J. (ed.). Encyclopedia of human intelligence. Vol. 1. Macmillan. pp. 260–266. ISBN 978-0-02-897407-1. OCLC 29594474.
- Gross, Miraca U.M. (2000). "Exceptionally and profoundly gifted students: An underserved population". Understanding Our Gifted. 12 (2): 3–9.
- Groth-Marnat, Gary (2009). Handbook of Psychological Assessment (Fifth ed.). Hoboken (NJ): Wiley. ISBN 978-0-470-08358-1.
- Hunt, Earl (2011). Human Intelligence. Cambridge: Cambridge University Press. ISBN 978-0-521-70781-7.
- Jensen, Arthur R. (2011). "The Theory of Intelligence and Its Measurement". Intelligence. 39 (4). International Society for Intelligence Research: 171–177. doi:10.1016/j.intell.2011.03.004. ISSN 0160-2896.
- Kamphaus, Randy W. (2005). Clinical Assessment of Child and Adolescent Intelligence (Second ed.). New York: Springer. ISBN 978-0-387-26299-4.
- Kamphaus, Randy; Winsor, Ann Pierce; Rowe, Ellen W.; Kim, Songwon (2012). "Chapter 2: A History of Intelligence Test Interpretation". In Flanagan, Dawn P.; Harrison, Patti L. (eds.). Contemporary Intellectual Assessment: Theories, tests, and issues (Third ed.). New York (NY): Guilford Press. pp. 56–70. ISBN 978-1-60918-995-2.
- Kaufman, Alan S. (2009). IQ Testing 101. New York: Springer Publishing. pp. 151–153. ISBN 978-0-8261-0629-2.
- Kaufman, Alan S.; Lichtenberger, Elizabeth O.; Fletcher-Janzen, Elaine; Kaufman, Nadeen L. (2005). Essentials of KABC-II Assessment. Hoboken (NJ): Wiley. ISBN 978-0-471-66733-9.
- Kaufman, Alan S.; Lichtenberger, Elizabeth O. (2006). Assessing Adolescent and Adult Intelligence (3rd ed.). Hoboken (NJ): Wiley. ISBN 978-0-471-73553-3.
- Kaufman, Scott Barry (1 June 2013). Ungifted: Intelligence Redefined. Basic Books. ISBN 978-0-465-02554-1.
- Leslie, Mitchell (July–August 2000). "The Vexing Legacy of Lewis Terman". Stanford Magazine. Archived from the original on 26 August 2021.
- Levine, Albert J.; Marks, Louis (1928). Testing Intelligence and Achievement. Macmillan. OCLC 1437258.
- Lohman, David F.; Foley Nicpon, Megan (2012). "Chapter 12: Ability Testing & Talent Identification" (PDF). In Hunsaker, Scott (ed.). Identification: The Theory and Practice of Identifying Students for Gifted and Talented Education Services. Waco (TX): Prufrock. pp. 287–386. ISBN 978-1-931280-17-4. Archived from the original (PDF) on 2016-03-15.
- Mackintosh, N. J. (2011). IQ and Human Intelligence (second ed.). Oxford: Oxford University Press. ISBN 978-0-19-958559-5. LCCN 2010941708.
- Matarazzo, Joseph D. (1972). Wechsler's Measurement and Appraisal of Adult Intelligence (fifth and enlarged ed.). Baltimore (MD): Williams & Witkins.
- McIntosh, David E.; Dixon, Felicia A.; Pierson, Eric E. (2012). "Chapter 25: Use of Intelligence Tests in the Identification of Giftedness". In Flanagan, Dawn P.; Harrison, Patti L. (eds.). Contemporary Intellectual Assessment: Theories, tests, and issues (Third ed.). New York (NY): Guilford Press. pp. 623–642. ISBN 978-1-60918-995-2.
- Meyer, Robert G.; Weaver, Christopher M. (2005). Law and Mental Health: A Case-Based Approach. New York: Guilford Press. ISBN 978-1-59385-221-4.
- Naglieri, Jack A. (1999). Essentials of CAS Assessment. Essentials of Psychological Assessment. Hoboken (NJ): Wiley. ISBN 978-0-471-29015-5.
- Park, Gregory; Lubinski, David; Benbow, Camilla P. (2 November 2010). "Recognizing Spatial Intelligence". Scientific American.
- Perleth, Christoph; Schatz, Tanja; Mönks, Franz J. (2000). "Early Identification of High Ability". In Heller, Kurt A.; Mönks, Franz J.; Sternberg, Robert J.; Subotnik, Rena F. (eds.). International Handbook of Giftedness and Talent (2nd ed.). Amsterdam: Pergamon. ISBN 978-0-08-043796-5.
- Pintner, Rudolph (1931). Intelligence Testing: Methods and Results. New York: Henry Holt.
- Reynolds, Cecil; Kamphaus, Randy (2003). "Reynolds Intellectual Assessment Scales™ (RIAS™)". PAR(Psychological Assessment Resources). Archived from the original (PowerPoint) on 9 October 2021.
- Reynolds, Cecil R.; Horton, Arthur M. (2012). "Chapter 3: Basic Psychometrics and Test Selection for an Independent Pediatric Forensic Neuropsychology Evaluation". In Sherman, Elizabeth M.; Brooks, Brian L. (eds.). Pediatric Forensic Neuropsychology (Third ed.). Oxford: Oxford University Press. pp. 41–65. ISBN 978-0-19-973456-6.
- Robinson, Andrew (2011). Genius: A Very Short Introduction. Oxford: Oxford University Press. ISBN 978-0-19-959440-5.
- Saklofske, Donald; Weiss, Lawrence; Beal, A. Lynne; Coalson, Diane (2003). "Chapter 1: The Wechsler Scales for Assessing Children's Intelligence: Past to Present". In Georgas, James; Weiss, Lawrence; van de Vijver, Fons; Saklofske, Donald (eds.). Culture and Children's Intelligence: Cross-Cultural Analysis of the WISC-III. San Diego (CA): Academic Press. pp. 3–21. ISBN 978-0-12-280055-9.
- Sattler, Jerome M. (1988). Assessment of Children (Third ed.). San Diego (CA): Jerome M. Sattler, Publisher. ISBN 978-0-9618209-0-9.
- Sattler, Jerome M. (2001). Assessment of Children: Cognitive Applications (Fourth ed.). San Diego (CA): Jerome M. Sattler, Publisher. ISBN 978-0-9618209-7-8.
- Sattler, Jerome M. (2008). Assessment of Children: Cognitive Foundations. La Mesa (CA): Jerome M. Sattler, Publisher. ISBN 978-0-9702671-4-6.
- Shurkin, Joel (1992). Terman's Kids: The Groundbreaking Study of How the Gifted Grow Up. Boston (MA): Little, Brown. ISBN 978-0-316-78890-8.
- Shurkin, Joel (2006). Broken Genius: The Rise and Fall of William Shockley, Creator of the Electronic Age. Macmillan. ISBN 978-1-4039-8815-7.
- Simonton, Dean Keith (1999). Origins of genius: Darwinian perspectives on creativity. Oxford: Oxford University Press. ISBN 978-0-19-512879-6.
- Spearman, C. (April 1904). ""General Intelligence," Objectively Determined and Measured" (PDF). American Journal of Psychology. 15 (2): 201–292. doi:10.2307/1412107. JSTOR 1412107. Archived from the original (PDF) on 7 April 2014.
- Spearman, Charles (1927). The Abilities of Man: Their Nature and Measurement. New York (NY): Macmillan.
- Sternberg, Robert J.; Jarvin, Linda; Grigorenko, Elena L. (2010). Explorations in Giftedness. Cambridge: Cambridge University Press. ISBN 978-0-521-74009-8.
- Strauss, Esther; Sherman, Elizabeth M.; Spreen, Otfried (2006). A Compendium of Neuropsychological Tests: Administration, Norms, and Commentary (Third ed.). Cambridge: Oxford University Press. ISBN 978-0-19-515957-8.
- Terman, Lewis M. (1916). The Measurement of Intelligence: An Explanation of and a Complete Guide to the Use of the Stanford Revision and Extension of the Binet–Simon Intelligence Scale. Riverside Textbooks in Education. Ellwood P. Cubberley (Editor's Introduction). Boston: Houghton Mifflin.
- Terman, Lewis M.; Merrill, Maude (1937). Measuring Intelligence: A Guide to the Administration of the New Revised Stanford–Binet Tests of Intelligence. Boston: Houghton Mifflin.
- Terman, Lewis Madison; Merrill, Maude A. (1960). Stanford–Binet Intelligence Scale: Manual for the Third Revision Form L-M with Revised IQ Tables by Samuel R. Pinneau. Boston (MA): Houghton Mifflin.
- Urbina, Susana (2011). "Chapter 2: Tests of Intelligence". In Sternberg, Robert J.; Kaufman, Scott Barry (eds.). The Cambridge Handbook of Intelligence. Cambridge: Cambridge University Press. pp. 20–38. ISBN 978-0-521-73911-5.
- Uzieblo, Katarzyna; Winter, Jan; Vanderfaeillie, Johan; Rossi, Gina; Magez, Walter (2012). "Intelligent Diagnosing of Intellectual Disabilities in Offenders: Food for Thought" (PDF). Behavioral Sciences & the Law. 30 (1): 28–48. doi:10.1002/bsl.1990. PMID 22241548.
- Wasserman, John D. (2012). "Chapter 1: A History of Intelligence Assessment". In Flanagan, Dawn P.; Harrison, Patti L. (eds.). Contemporary Intellectual Assessment: Theories, tests, and issues (Third ed.). New York (NY): Guilford Press. pp. 3–55. ISBN 978-1-60918-995-2.
- Wechsler, David (1939). The Measurement of Adult Intelligence (first ed.). Baltimore (MD): Williams & Witkins. LCCN 39014016.
- Wechsler, David (1958). The Measurement and Appraisal of Adult Intelligence (fourth ed.). Baltimore (MD): Williams & Witkins.
- Weiss, Lawrence G.; Saklofske, Donald H.; Prifitera, Aurelio; Holdnack, James A., eds. (2006). WISC-IV Advanced Clinical Interpretation. Practical Resources for the Mental Health Professional. Burlington (MA): Academic Press. ISBN 978-0-12-088763-7. This practitioner's handbook includes chapters by L.G. Weiss, J.G. Harris, A. Prifitera, T. Courville, E. Rolfhus, D.H. Saklofske, J.A. Holdnack, D. Coalson, S.E. Raiford, D.M. Schwartz, P. Entwistle, V. L. Schwean, and T. Oakland.
