= MSCA =

MSCA may refer to:

- Marie Skłodowska-Curie Actions, a set of major research fellowships in the European Research Area (ERA)
- McCarthy Scales of Children's Abilities
- Microsoft Campus Agreement
- Mount Saint Charles Academy
