= Toshinori Ishikuma =

Japanese psychologist

- Born: September 1950 (age 75); Yamaguchi Prefecture
- Citizenship: Japan
- Education: University of Montevallo, University of Alabama
- Known for: establishing the system of the School Psychology in Japan, Japanese versions of Kaufman Assessment Battery for Children and Wechsler Intelligence Scale for Children-III and IV
- Awards: President's Award to Outstanding Contribution (2012) National Association of School Psychologists; Outstanding Article Award (2004) with S. Tamura, Japanese Association of Educational Psychology; Outstanding Research Award, Second Place (1987) with A. S. Kaufman, J.M. McLean and S. Moon, Mid-South Educational Research Association Conference
- Scientific career
- Fields: School Psychology, Multicultural Psychology, Psychological assessment
- Workplaces: Tokyo Seitoku University, University of Tsukuba
- Doctoral advisor: Alan S. Kaufman

Toshinori Ishikuma (born September 1950) is a Japanese psychologist. He is known for his work on introducing and establishing the system of school psychology services in Japan, and his expert guidance and training in chosen students for psychology He was among key psychologists who started certifying school psychologists in Japan in 1997. He is also famous for development of individual intelligence tests such as the Japanese versions of Kaufman Assessment Battery for Children, Kaufman Assessment Battery for Children-Second Edition, and Japanese versions of Wechsler Intelligence Scale for Children -III and IV, as well as Wechsler Adult Intelligence Scale,- IV. He is now working to produce the Japanese version of Wechsler Intelligence Scale for Children -V. He was also among important members of movement toward "Certified Public Psychologist Bill", which was passed in 2015.

== Early life and career ==
Born in Yamaguchi Prefecture, Japan, Ishikuma earned his bachelor's degree from University of Montevallo in 1985; M.A. in Educational Psychology from University of Alabama in 1986; and Ph.D. from University of Alabama in 1990 (under Alan S. Kaufman), specializing in School Psychology. He learned about psychological services with a focus on each child's strengths in intelligence and a philosophy of intelligent testing from Alan S. Kaufman and his wife, Nadeen L. Kaufman.

While Lecturer at San Diego State University (1989–1990), he worked with Carol Robinson-Zañartu, Valerie J. Cook-Morales, and Colette Ingraham. He was influenced by them and learned the assessment and services for children within the environmental and multicultural context and by integration with ecological processes. For his interests in Rational Emotive Therapy (RET) in Counseling, he had an opportunity to be supervised by Albert Ellis. From Ellis, he learned how to serve people with focuses on resolving cognitive, emotional and behavioral problems and disturbances and enabling people to lead happier and more fulfilling lives. He applies and revised the RET to be useful and effective for Japanese clients by integrating RET with humanistic approaches.

He is certified as Supervisor for both of School Psychologist and Special Education Needs Specialist in Japan. He is a member of several expert working groups for Ministry of Education, Culture, Sports, Science and Technology (MEXT) and academic associations such as the President of Japanese School Psychology Association (JSPA) and Japanese Association of School Psychologists (JASP). He was vice president and executive director of the University of Tsukuba and superintendent of Education Bureau of the University of Tsukuba Laboratory Schools. Currently, he is Professor of Psychology and Dean of Graduate School of Psychology at Tokyo Seitoku University.

He has been providing psychological support for children in the affected areas by The Great East Japan earthquake as a coordinator for Child and School Support Team in the Japanese Association of School Psychologists, as well as a leader of Psychological Support Team for Children in Fukushima Educational Board. For this work, he was awarded "President's Award to Outstanding Contribution" from National Association of School Psychologists in 2012.

== Awards and honors ==
- Honorary Membership, Indigenous Social Science Society, in Taiwan (2023)
- Honorary Membership, Japanese Academy of Learning Disability(2023)
- Honorary Membership, Japanese Association of counseling Science(2022)
- Contribution Award, Japanese Academy of Learning Disability(2016)
- President's Award to Outstanding Contribution, National Association of School Psychologists (2012)
- Outstanding Article Award, with S. Tamura, Japanese Association of Educational Psychology (2004)
- Most Outstanding Student Award, College of Education, The University of Alabama (1989)
- Outstanding Research Award, Second Place, with A. S. Kaufman, J.M. McLean and S. Moon, Mid-South Educational Research Association Conference (1987)
- Outstanding Teaching Assistant Award, College of Education, The University of Alabama (1987)
- Successive Approximation Award in Psychology, University of Montevallo (1985)
- Outstanding International Student Award, Gadsden State Junior College (1983)

In 2013, for memorizing his contribution in the field of school psychology for years, "Toshinori Ishikuma School Psychology Award", named after him was established in Japanese School Psychology Association (JSPA).

== Professional associations ==
- National Association of School Psychologists
- International School Psychology Association
- Japanese School Psychology Association (past president)
- Japanese Association of School Psychologists (on the board of directors)
- Japanese Organization of Certifying and Managing School Psychologist (president)
- Japanese School Counseling Association (past president)
- Japanese Association of Educational Psychology
- Japanese Academy of Learning Disabilities
- Japanese Union of Psychological Associations (vice president)
- Japanese Association of Certified Public Psychologists (vice president)

== Development of intelligence scales ==
- Matsubara, T.; Fujita, K.; Maekawa, H.; Ishikuma, T. (1993). Japanese K-ABC: Administration and scoring manual. Tōkyō: Maruzen Mates.
- Azuma, H.; Ueno, K.; Maekawa, H.; Ishikuma, T.; Sano, H. (1998). Japanese WISC-III Manual. Tōkyō: Nihon Bunka Kagakusha.
- Ueno, K.; Fujita, K.; Maekawa, H.; Ishikuma, T.; Dairoku, K.; Matsuda, O. (2011). Japanese version of the Wechsler Scale for Children- IV. Tōkyō: Nihon Bunka Kagakusha.
- Kaufman, A.S; Kaufman, N.L.; Fujita, K.; Ishikuma, T.; Aoyama, S.; Hattori, T.; Kumagai, K.;Ono, J. (2013) Japanese version of K-ABC－II Maruzenn
- Wechsler, D.; Uemo, K.; Ishikuma, T; Dairoku, K.; Matsuda,.; Yamanaka, K. (2018) Japanese version of Wechsler Adult Intelligence Scale-IV. Nihon Bunka Kagakusha
- Wechsler, D.; Uemo, K.; Ishikuma, T; Dairoku, K.; Matsuda,.; Nagoshi，N；Nakatani, I(2021) Japanese version of the Wechsler Scale for Children-V. Tokyo：Nihon Bunka Kagakusha.

== Major publications in Japanese ==
- Ishikuma, Toshinori (1999). School psychology : psycho-educational services by a team of teachers, school counselor, and parents. Tōkyō: Seishin Shobō. ISBN 9784414301496.
- Ishikuma, T.; Tamura, S. (2003). Introduction to team support by using Ishikuma-Tamura Support Sheet; School Psychology Practices. Tōkyō: Tosho Bunkasha. ISBN 9784810033922.
- Fukuzawa, S.; Ishikuma, T.; Onose, M. (2004). apanese School Psychology Association (ed.). Handbook of school psychology. Tōkyō: Kyoiku shuppan. ISBN 9784316800608.
- Ishikuma, T.; Ito, S. (2005). Live flexibly: Learning from Rational Emotive Therapy and stuttering. Tōkyō: Kanekoshobō. ISBN 4760836071.
- Toshinori, Ishikuma (2006). Psychology of helping and being helped learning from "Tora-san and Hama-chan": Six lessons to live flexibly. Tōkyō: Seishin Shobō. ISBN 9784414403633.
- Mizuno, H.; Ishikuma, T. (2009). Effective services in schools: forefront of school psychology. Kyōto: Nakanishiyashuppan. ISBN 9784779503481.
- Tsuge, M.; Ishikuma, T. (2013). Special needs education in senior high schools; 70 questions and answers for parents and teachers. Tōkyō: Kanekoshobō. ISBN 9784760823772.
- Mizuno, H.; Ishikuma, T.; Tamura, S.; Tamura, S.; Iida, J. (2013). Introduction to School Psychology. Kyōto: Mineruva Shobō. ISBN 9784623063963.

== Publications in English ==
- Moon, S.; Ishikuma, T.; Kaufman, A. S. (1987). "Joint factor analysis of the K-ABC and McCarthy Scales". Perceptual and Motor Skills. 65 (3): 699–704. doi:10.2466/pms.1987.65.3.699. PMID 3438113. S2CID 25731766.
- Ishikuma, T.; Moon, S.; Kaufman, A. S. (1988). "Sequential-simultaneous analysis of Japanese children's performance on the Japanese McCarthy Scales". Perceptual and Motor Skills. 66 (2): 355–362. doi:10.2466/pms.1988.66.2.355. S2CID 145779459.
- Kaufman, A. S.; McLean, J. E.; Ishikuma, T.; Moon, S. (1989). "Integration of the literature on the intelligence of Japanese children and analysis of the data from a sequential and simultaneous model". School Psychology International. 10: 73–183. doi:10.1177/0143034389103002. S2CID 144715530.
- Kaufman, A. S.; Ishikuma, T.; Kaufman-Packe, J. (1991). "Amazingly short forms of the WAIS-R". Journal of Psychoeducational Assessment. 9: 4–15. doi:10.1177/073428299100900101. S2CID 143501659.
- Ishikuma, T. (1991). "Introduction to cross-cultural communication in English". University of Tsukuba English Counseling: 59–68.
- Hersen, Thomas H.; Ollendick, Michel. eds. (1993). Handbook of child and adolescent assessment. Boston: Allyn and Bacon. pp. 192–207. ISBN 9780205145928.
- Valasquez, R.J.; Callahan, W.J.; Evans, D.; Ishikuma, T. (1994). "DSM-III-R training in master's-level counseling programs". Psychological Reports. 74 (3 Pt 2): 1331–1338. doi:10.2466/pr0.1994.74.3c.1331. PMID 8084954. S2CID 28940886.
- Kaufman, A. S.; Ishikuma, T.; Kaufman, N. L. (1994). "A Horn analysis of the factors measured by the WAIS-R, Kaufman Adolescent and Adult Intelligence Test (KAIT), and two new brief cognitive measures for normal adolescents and adults". Assessment. 1 (4): 353–366. doi:10.1177/107319119400100404. S2CID 143263242.
- Ishikuma, T. (2003). "Policy and direction of development of counseling profession in Japan". Konvensi National Bimbingan Dan Kouseling: 18–22.
- Jimerson, Shane R.; Oakland, Thomas; Farrell, Peter T. eds. (2007). The handbook of international school psychology. Thousand Oaks [u.a.]: Sage. pp. 217–227. ISBN 9781412926690.
- Kaufman, James C. (2009). Intelligent testing : integrating psychological theory and clinical practice. Cambridge [England]: Cambridge University Press. pp. 183–190. ISBN 978-0521861212.
- T. Ishikuma; H. Nishiyama (December 2011). "Appreciation for Support for Japan in Responding to the Natural Disaster". NASP Communiqué (CQ). 40 (4).
- Ishikuma, T.; Matsuda, O.; Ueno, K. S. (2016). "Intellectual assessment of children and youth in Japan: Past, present, and future". International Journal of School & Educational Psychology. 4 (4): 241–246. doi:10.1080/21683603.2016.1163711. S2CID 147582780.
