= KABC =

KABC may refer to:

- KABC (AM), a radio station (790 AM) licensed to Los Angeles, California, United States
- KABC-TV, a television station (channel 7) licensed to Los Angeles, California
- Karbi-Anglong Baptist Convention
- Kaufman Assessment Battery for Children, a psychological test to measure intelligence of children
- KKYX, a radio station (680 AM) licensed to San Antonio, Texas, which used the call sign KABC from 1931 to 1954
- KLOS, a radio station (95.5 FM) licensed to Los Angeles, California, which used the call sign KABC-FM from 1954 to 1969
