= KBIT =

KBIT, Kbit or kbit may refer to:

- Kilobit, 1000 bits
- Kibibit, 1024 bits
- KBIT-LD, a low-power television station (channel 24, virtual 43) licensed to serve Monterey, California, United States
- KBIT-LD (Chico, California), a defunct low-power television station (channel 50) formerly licensed to serve Chico, California
- KBIT (IQ test)
