= Nadeen L. Kaufman =

American psychologist

Nadeem L. Kaufman
- Born: January 1945 (age 81); Brooklyn, New York
- Education: Hofstra University (BS); Columbia University (MA, EdM, EdD)
- Occupation: Psychologist
- Known for: Learning and Reading Disabilities
- Spouse: Alan S. Kaufman
- Children: James C. Kaufman; Jennie Kaufman Singer

Nadeen L. Kaufman (born January 1945) is an American psychology professor known for her contribution to learning disability research.

== Biography ==
Nadeen was born in Brooklyn, New York, and raised in Long Island, New York. She earned a Bachelor of Science in Education from Hofstra University in 1965; a master's degree in Educational Psychology from Columbia University in 1972; an Ed.M. in Learning and Reading Disabilities from Columbia University in 1975; and an Ed.D. in Special Education—Neurosciences from Columbia University in 1978. She completed a predoctoral internship and a postdoctoral fellowship in psychology at Yale University.

Kaufman has taught learning-disabled children and worked as a school psychologist, learning disabilities specialist, university professor, and founder-director of several psychoeducational clinics. She also was a direct participant in the development and standardization of the McCarthy Scales and WISC-R.

Nadeen has been married to psychologist Alan S. Kaufman since 1964. From 1974 to 1997, Kaufman and her husband trained school psychologists and clinical psychologists and supervised graduate-student research at the University of Georgia, the National College of Education (now National Louis University) in Chicago, Illinois, the California School of Professional Psychology in San Diego, and the University of Alabama. The research team they supervised while at the University of Georgia in 1978-79 helped the Kaufmans to develop the original K-ABC test. The Kaufmans’ went on to create several other psychological and educational tests, including the Kaufman Test of Educational Achievement (K-TEA/NU), Kaufman Brief Intelligence Test (K-BIT), and the second editions of both (KTEA-II and KBIT-2). The Kaufman Survey of Early Academic and Language Skills (K-SEALS) and the Cognitive/Language Profile of the Early Screening Profiles address the preschool level. The Kaufman Adolescent and Adult Intelligence Test (KAIT), the Kaufman Short Neuropsychological Assessment Procedure (K-SNAP), and the Kaufman Functional Academic Skills Test (K-FAST) extend through the adult life span.

Both Nadeen and Alan have been at Yale University's Child Study Center in the School of Medicine since 1997.

In 2004/2005, revised versions of the Kaufmans' tests were published, including the KABC-II, KTEA-II, and KBIT-2. The KABC-II integrates both the PASS and CHC theories of intelligence.

== Personal life ==
Their son is psychologist James C. Kaufman. Their daughter is clinical and forensic psychologist Jennie Kaufman Singer. Dr. Kaufman also has 8 grandchildren and one great-grandchild.

== Honors ==
- Fellow of APA's Division 16 (School Psychology).
- School Neuropsychology Summer Institute KIDS, Inc. Lifetime Achievement Award, 2012. She received the award jointly with her husband.
