= Alan S. Kaufman =

American psychologist, writer, and research professor (born 1944)

- Born: April 1944 (age 82); Brooklyn, New York, U.S.
- Education: University of Pennsylvania (BA); Columbia University (MA, PhD)
- Known for: Kaufman Assessment Battery for Children
- Scientific career
- Fields: Psychometrics
- Workplaces: Yale University, University of Connecticut
- Doctoral advisor: Robert Thorndike
- Doctoral students: Cecil Reynolds, Jack Naglieri, Toshinori Ishikuma

Alan S. Kaufman (born April 1944) is an American psychologist, writer, and research professor known for his work on intelligence testing.

== Early life and career ==
Born in Brooklyn and raised on Long Island, Kaufman earned his bachelor's degree from the University of Pennsylvania in 1965; M.A. in Educational Psychology from Columbia University in 1967; and Ph.D. from Columbia University in 1970 (under Robert L. Thorndike), specializing in psychometrics.

He has been married to psychologist Nadeen L. Kaufman since 1964. While Assistant Director at The Psychological Corporation from 1968 to 1974, he worked closely with David Wechsler on the revision of the Wechsler Intelligence Scale for Children (WISC-R) and supervised its standardization. He also collaborated with Dorothea McCarthy in the development and standardization of the McCarthy Scales of Children's Abilities. He held positions at University of Georgia (1974–1979), University of Alabama (1984–1995), and Yale University (1997-2023) before taking a position at University of Connecticut.

== Development of Kaufman IQ scales ==
The research team that Kaufman and his wife supervised while at the University of Georgia in 1978-79 developed the original Kaufman Assessment Battery for Children (K-ABC) and several other psychological and educational tests, including the Kaufman Test of Educational Achievement (K-TEA/NU), Kaufman Brief Intelligence Test (K-BIT), and the second editions of both ( KTEA-II and KBIT-2). The Kaufman Survey of Early Academic and Language Skills (K-SEALS) and the Cognitive/Language Profile of the Early Screening Profiles address the preschool level. The Kaufman Adolescent and Adult Intelligence Test (KAIT), the Kaufman Short Neuropsychological Assessment Procedure (K-SNAP), and the Kaufman Functional Academic Skills Test (K-FAST) extend through the adult life span.

In 2004/2005, revised versions of the Kaufmans' tests were published, including the KABC-II, KTEA-II, and KBIT-2. The KABC-II integrates both the PASS and CHC theories of intelligence.

== Overview of Kaufman's tests ==
Kaufman Brief Intelligence Test (KBIT)

The Kaufman Brief Intelligence Test (KBIT) is a brief, individually administered measure of verbal (vocabulary subtest) and non verbal (Matrices subtest) intelligence. It can be used with those aged 4–90 years old and takes between 15–30 minutes to administer. It can be useful in a variety of settings including clinical, educational, vocational, and research settings. The original KBIT was published in 1990, while the second edition (KBIT-2) followed in 2004.

The KBIT-2 generates three scores: Verbal, Non Verbal and an overall IQ composite. Theoretically the verbal subtests measure crystallised ability and the non verbal subtests measure fluid reasoning.

The Verbal portion of the KBIT-2 is made up of two subtests, Verbal Knowledge and Riddles. These measure verbal, school related skills by measuring an individual's word knowledge, verbal concept formation, reasoning ability and range of general information. The Non Verbal portion is made up of the Matrices subtest and measures the ability to solve new problems by assessing ability to perceive relationships and complete visual analogies.

Kaufman Test of Educational Achievement (KTEA)

The KTEA provides an individually administered measure of educational achievement for those aged 4 years 6 months – 25 years (comprehensive form) and 4 years 6 months – 90+ (brief form). The test can be used to identify an individual's strengths and weaknesses in three key domains: maths, written language and spoken language. It can also be used as part of a comprehensive psychological, psychoeducational or neuropsychological test battery which can enhance understanding of the individuals total functioning.

The current edition was published in 2004. Since its publication it has become a widely used measure of academic achievement in education. The test takes between 15–80 minutes to administer and there are two alternate forms which enables it to be used to monitor progress or response to intervention.

The Comprehensive Form consists of 14 subtests grouped into 4 domain composites, 4 reading-related composites, an overall Comprehensive Achievement Composite in addition to separate subtest scores.

The Brief Form is a curriculum-based instrument which provides norm-referenced assessment in the same three core achievement domains as the comprehensive form. There is no content overlap with the Comprehensive Form, it can be used for retesting and includes the following subtests:

- Reading — word recognition and reading comprehension
- Maths — computation and application problems
- Written expression — written language and spelling.

The Brief Form provides a battery composite as well as subtest scores in reading, maths and spelling.

== Influence on other researchers ==
Widely regarded as a teacher and mentor, as well as a researcher, Kaufman's cadre of doctoral students at the University of Georgia has gone on to become a significant influence in the field as well. Kaufman mentored, among others, Cecil R. Reynolds, Randy W. Kamphaus, Bruce Bracken, Steve McCallum, Jack A. Naglieri, and Patti Harrison, all of whom became Professors at major universities and authors of some of the most widely used psychological tests in the United States. Also Kaufman with his wife, Nadeen, supervised foreign doctoral students at the University of Alabama including Toshinori Ishikuma and Soo-Back Moon, who became influential Professors in mother countries and translated and adopted the K-ABC for Japanese and Korean children, respectively.

== Publications ==
- Flanagan, Dawn P.; Kaufman, Alan S. (2009). Essentials of WISC-IV Assessment. Essentials of Psychological Assessment (2nd ed.). Hoboken (NJ): Wiley. ISBN 978-0-470-18915-3.
- Kaufman, Alan S. (1990). Assessing Adolescent and Adult Intelligence (first ed.). Boston (MA): Allyn and Bacon. ISBN 0-205-12390-2.
- Kaufman, Alan S. (1994). Intelligent Testing with the WISC-III. Wiley Series on Personality Processes. New York (NY): Wiley. ISBN 0-471-57845-2.
- Kaufman, Alan S. (2009). IQ Testing 101. New York: Springer Publishing. ISBN 978-0-8261-0629-2.
- Kaufman, Alan S.; Lichtenberger, Elizabeth (2006). Assessing Adolescent and Adult Intelligence (3rd ed.). Hoboken (NJ): Wiley. ISBN 978-0-471-73553-3.

== Children ==
His son is a professor and researcher in psychology (creativity): James C. Kaufman.
