= Wechsler Individual Achievement Test =

Academic achievement exam

The Wechsler Individual Achievement Test Second Edition (WIAT-II; Wechsler, 2005) assesses the academic achievement of children, adolescents, college students and adults, aged 4 through 85. The test enables the assessment of a broad range of academics skills or only a particular area of need. The WIAT-II is a revision of the original WIAT (The Psychological Corporation), and additional measures. There are four basic scales: Reading, Math, Writing and Oral Language. Within these scales there is a total of 9 sub-test scores.

== History ==
The first WIAT was published in 1992 and it was standardized in UK and published as the word, "WOND and WOLD". It was revised in 2001 and followed by the UK version in 2005. Each revision has brought with it several updates and changes. The WIAT-II contains the basic contacademically.

There are a small number of differences made between the versions of the subtests in the UK and US. These include changes in the picture items, replacing of Americanisms and simple spelling differences. The WIAT-III US edition was published in 2009 for use with those aged 4 till 50 years and 11 months. It includes 16 subtests which is divided into Oral Reading, Math Fluency and Early Reading Skills.

== Test Format ==
Reading

- Word Reading: assesses pre-reading (phonological awareness) and decoding skills (naming letters, phonological skills [working with sounds in words], reading words from lists).
- Reading Comprehension: assesses types of reading comprehension skills taught in the classroom or used in everyday life (matching words to pictures, reading sentences aloud, orally answering oral questions about reading passages, silent reading speed).
- Pseudoword (phonetic) Decoding: assesses the ability to apply phonetic decoding skills. (Reading nonsense words aloud from a list [phonetic word attack]).

Math

- Numerical Operations: evaluates the ability to identify and write numbers ( e.g. counting, and solving paper & pencil computations).
- Math Reasoning: assess the ability to reason mathematically ( e.g. counting, identifying shapes, and solving verbally framed "word problems" [presented both orally and either written or in illustration]).

Written Language

- Spelling: evaluates the ability to spell (written spelling of dictated letters, sounds and words that are read in sentences).
- Written Expression: assesses the writing process (writing letters and words as quickly as possible, writing sentences, and writing a paragraph or essay).

Oral Language

- Listening Comprehension: measures the ability to listen for details (multiple-choice matching of pictures to spoken words).
- Oral Expression: assesses general ability to use oral language effectively (repeating sentences, generating lists, describing scenes and pictured activities).

The WIAT-III US consists of 16 subtests including several not featured in the second edition: Oral Reading Fluency, Math Problem Solving, Math Fluency Addition /Subtraction /Multiplication, Early Reading Skills, Alphabet Writing Fluency, Sentence Composition and Essay Composition. The test takes 45–90 minutes to administer depending on the age of the participant. The mean score for the WIAT-II is 100 with a standard deviation of 15, and the scores on the test may range from 40 to 160. 68% of participants in the UK standardisation sample obtained scores of 85-115 and 95% obtained scores of 70-130.

== Psychometric Properties ==
- Internal consistency ranges from 0.80-0.98.
- Test-retest reliability ranges from 0.85-0.98.

WIAT–II has been empirically linked with the WISC–IV, the WPPSI–III, and the WAIS–III. These relationships provide valid discrepancy scores to allow comparisons between achievement and ability. The WIAT-II UK was standardised between 2003-2004 as part of the WISC-IV standardisation with 892 individuals aged 4–16 years 11 months (US norms are available up to age 85). The UK project was conducted at City University by Professor John Rust and Professor Susan Golombok. The WAIT-II standardisation also includes several special group studies including those with learning difficulties, ADHD, emotional disturbance, hearing impairments, speech and language impairments and those who are classed as gifted.

The WIAT-III US was standardised on 3,000 students and adults aged 4–19:11. Linking studies were carried out with the WAIS-IV, WISC-IV, WPPSI-III, WNV, and DAS-II with correlations ranging from .60-.82. Special group studies include those with learning difficulties in reading, writing and math, expressive language disorder and mild intellectual difficulties.

== Uses ==
The WIAT-II is suitable for use in clinical, educational and research settings. It can be used to identify the academic strengths and weakness and individual possess of, as well as inform and aid intervention planning. It can be used in a variety of settings where there is concern over educational progress. The WIAT-II can provide meaningful information to assist with diagnostic, eligibility, placement and intervention decisions. Best practice suggests the results obtained from the WIAT-II should be interpreted in combination with the evaluation and review of the individual’s background, personality, current emotional functioning, and attention and motivation levels.

Like all assessment instruments, the WIAT-II has certain limitations. Academic achievement can be conceptualised and assessed in many different ways. As a result, it is impossible to develop an instrument that assesses all components of achievement within the constraints of a typical standardised assessment situation. The WIAT-II measures aspects of the learning process that take place in the traditional academic setting in the areas of reading, writing, mathematics and oral language. Although the WIAT-II item content encompasses a wide range of skills and concepts, it was not designed as a measure of academic giftedness in older adolescents or adults.

== Translations ==
There have been several adaptations of the WIAT-II for use with; Australian, New Zealand, Canadian and French Canadian populations.

== See also ==
- Wechler Intelligence Scale for Children
- Wechsler Adult Intelligence Scale
- WPPSI
- Cognitive test
- Intelligence quotient

== Sources ==
- The Psychological Corporation. (1992). Wechsler Individual Achievement Test. San Antonio, TX: Author.
- Wechsler, D. (2005). Wechsler Individual Achievement Test 2nd Edition (WIAT II). London: The Psychological Corp.
