= James C. Kaufman =

American psychologist

- Born: Great Neck, New York, U.S.
- Education: Yale University; University of Southern California
- Scientific career
- Fields: Creativity, Cognitive Psychology, Educational Psychology, Personality Psychology
- Workplaces: University of Connecticut
- Website: http://www.jamesckaufman.com

James C. Kaufman is an American psychologist known for his research on creativity. He is a Professor of Educational Psychology at the University of Connecticut in Storrs, Connecticut. Previously, he taught at the California State University, San Bernardino, where he directed the Learning Research Institute. He received his Ph.D. from Yale University in Cognitive Psychology, where he worked with Robert J. Sternberg.

== Early life ==
Born in Great Neck, New York, he attended the University of Southern California as an undergraduate in creative writing and psychology, where he worked with both John L. Horn and novelist T. Coraghessan Boyle. His parents are psychologists Alan S. Kaufman and Nadeen L. Kaufman.

== Career ==
He is a prolific researcher and editor who is best known for his theoretical contributions to the study of creativity. His most prominent theoretical work, with Ron Beghetto, is the Four-C Model of Creativity. This model explores the idea of expanding traditional conceptions of eminent creativity ("Big-C") and everyday creativity ("little-c") to include "mini-c"—creativity that is inherent in the learning process—and "Pro-c"—creativity at a professional level that has not yet had a historical impact. Kaufman and Beghetto have further proposed the construct of creative metacognition, which refers to both knowing one's creative strengths and weaknesses as well as recognizing appropriate times and contexts to express one's creativity.

In addition, with Robert Sternberg and Jean Pretz, he developed the propulsion model of creative contributions, outlined in the book The Creativity Conundrum. With John Baer, he developed the Amusement Park Theoretical (APT) Model of Creativity.

Kaufman's empirical work has focused on a few different key areas. Most media attention has focused on his research on creativity and mental illness. He coined "the Sylvia Plath Effect," after finding that female poets were more likely to be mentally ill than other writers, in a paper in the Journal of Creative Behavior, and his work on poets dying young has been featured in the New York Times, NPR, BBC, CNN, and newspapers and magazines across the world. He has recently focused on issues of creativity and fairness, arguing that creativity should be a supplemental part of college admissions

Kaufman has written and edited more than 50 books, including Creativity 101 (Springer, 2016), the Cambridge Handbook of Creativity (with Sternberg; Cambridge, 2010), Essentials of Creativity Assessment (with Jonathan A. Plucker and John Baer; Wiley, 2008), the ALA Choice award winning Teaching for Creativity in the Common Core Classroom (with Ron Beghetto and John Baer; Teachers College Press, 2014), and The Psychology of Creative Writing (with Scott Barry Kaufman, Cambridge, 2009). He was the Series Editor of the Explorations in Creativity Research series for Academic Press.

Kaufman was the founding co-editor of both Psychology of Popular Media Culture and Psychology of Aesthetics, Creativity, and the Arts, both published by the American Psychological Association. He is the senior associate editor of Creativity Research Journal. He received the 2003 Daniel E. Berlyne Award from Division 10 of the American Psychological Association for outstanding research by a junior scholar; the National Association of Gifted Children's 2008 E. Paul Torrance Award for creativity research; the 2009 Western Psychological Association Early Career in Research Award; the 2011 Paul Farnworth Award, also from Division 10 of the American Psychological Association, for service to the division; the 2011-2012 Mensa Award for Research Excellence.; and the 2017 Rudolf Arnheim Award for outstanding research by a senior scholar. He is a past president of the American Psychological Association's Division 10.

Kaufman is also a playwright and lyricist. His musical, Discovering Magenta, written with composer Michael Bitterman, had its premiere in 2015 in New York City as part of the Thespis Theatre Festival. The musical is the story of a mental health worker trying to help a patient who has suffered past His short play "My Very Elegant Mother" made its NYC debut in 2008 at the Riant Theatre and was adapted into an audiobook.

== Works ==
Pseudoscience: The Conspiracy against Science (MIT Press) edited by Kaufman and collaborator (and wife) Allison B. Kaufman was released in 2018 and contains essays by experts on pseudoscience like Kevin Folta, Britt Hermes and David Gorski. Kaufman contributes an essay with Paul Joseph Barnett who explains that "pseudoscientific beliefs have been flourishing because of the idea that '"everybody has the right not to be offended'".
