= David Wechsler =

Romanian-American psychologist (1896–1981)

David "Weshy" Wechsler
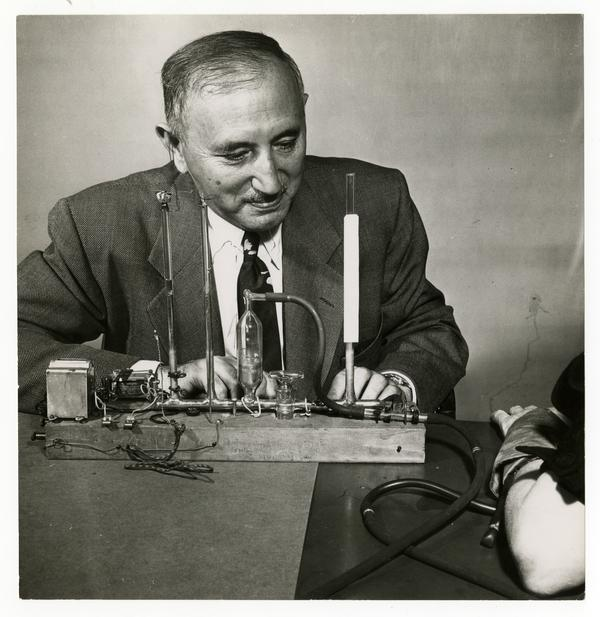
- Wechsler seated at a table, conducting a test on a patient
- Born: January 12, 1896; Lespezi, Romania
- Died: May 2, 1981 (aged 85); New York City, U.S.
- Education: City College of New York; Columbia University
- Known for: Wechsler Adult Intelligence Scale, Wechsler Intelligence Scale for Children
- Scientific career
- Fields: Psychology
- Workplaces: Bellevue Hospital (1932-1967), Chief Psychologist
- Doctoral advisor: Robert S. Woodworth

David "Weshy" Wechsler (/ˈwɛkslər/; January 12, 1896 – May 2, 1981) was a Romanian-American psychologist. He developed well-known intelligence scales, such as the Wechsler Adult Intelligence Scale (WAIS) and the Wechsler Intelligence Scale for Children (WISC) to get to know his patients at Bellevue Hospital. A Review of General Psychology survey, published in 2002, ranked Wechsler as the 51st most cited psychologist of the 20th century.

== Early life and education ==
Wechsler was born in a Jewish family in Lespezi, Romania, and emigrated with his parents to the United States as a child. He studied at the City College of New York and Columbia University, where he earned his master's degree in 1917 and his Ph.D. in 1925 under the direction of Robert S. Woodworth. During World War I, he worked with the United States Army to develop psychological tests to screen new draftees while studying under Charles Spearman and Karl Pearson.

== Career ==
=== Bellevue Hospital ===
After short stints at various locations (including five years in private practice), Wechsler became chief psychologist at Bellevue Psychiatric Hospital in 1932, where he stayed until 1967.

Wechsler was member of a 1947 mission to set up a mental health program and clinic for Jewish survivors of the Holocaust.

=== Intelligence scales ===
Wechsler is best known for his intelligence tests. He was one of the most influential advocates of the role of nonintellective factors in testing. He emphasized that factors other than intellectual ability are involved in intelligent behavior. Wechsler objected to the single score offered by the 1937 Binet scale, finding the then-current Binet IQ test unsatisfactory. Wechsler originally created his tests to find out more about his patients at the Bellevue clinic. This battery differed greatly from the Binet scale which, in Wechsler's day, was generally considered the supreme authority with regard to intelligence testing. As the 1960 form of Lewis Terman's Stanford–Binet Intelligence Scales was less carefully developed than previous versions, Form I of the WAIS surpassed the Stanford–Binet tests in popularity by the 1960s.

Although his test did not directly measure nonintellective factors, it took these factors into careful account in its underlying theory. The Wechsler Adult Intelligence Scale (WAIS) was developed first in 1939 and then called the Wechsler-Bellevue Intelligence Test. From these he derived the Wechsler Intelligence Scale for Children (WISC) in 1949 and the Wechsler Preschool and Primary Scale of Intelligence (WPPSI) in 1967. The tests are still based on his philosophy that intelligence is "the global capacity to act purposefully, to think rationally, and to deal effectively with [one's] environment" (cited in Kaplan & Saccuzzo, p. 256).

The Wechsler scales introduced many novel concepts and breakthroughs to the intelligence testing movement. First, he did away with the quotient scores of older intelligence tests (the Q in "I.Q."). Instead, he assigned an arbitrary value of 100 to the mean intelligence and added or subtracted another 15 points for each standard deviation above or below the mean the subject was. While not rejecting the concept of general intelligence (as conceptualized by his teacher Charles Spearman), he divided the concept of intelligence into two main areas: verbal and performance (non-verbal) scales, each evaluated with different subtests.

== Personal life ==
He died on May 2, 1981.

== Bibliography ==
- Frank, George (1983). The Wechsler Enterprise: An Assessment of the Development, Structure, and Use of the Wechsler Tests of Intelligence. Oxford: Pergamon. ISBN 978-0-08-027973-2.
- Kaplan, Robert M.; Saccuzzo, Dennis P. (2009). Psychological Testing: Principles, Applications, and Issues (Seventh ed.). Belmont (CA): Wadsworth. ISBN 978-0-495-09555-2.
- Kaufman, Alan S.; Raiford, Susan Engi; Coalson, Diane L. (2016). Intelligent Testing with the WISC-V. Wiley. New York (NY): Wiley. ISBN 978-1-118-58923-6.
- Kaufman, Alan S. (2009). IQ Testing 101. New York: Springer Publishing. ISBN 978-0-8261-0629-2.
- Kaufman, Alan S.; Lichtenberger, Elizabeth (2006). Assessing Adolescent and Adult Intelligence (3rd ed.). Hoboken (NJ): Wiley. ISBN 978-0-471-73553-3.
- Wechsler, David (1939). The Measurement of Adult Intelligence. Baltimore (MD): Williams & Witkins.
- Wechsler, David (1958). The Measurement and Appraisal of Adult Intelligence (fourth ed.). Baltimore (MD): Williams & Witkins.
