= Peabody Individual Achievement Test =

The Peabody Individual Achievement Test is a criterion based survey of an individual’s scholastic attainment. It can be administered to individuals between the ages of five and 22 years of age, and returns a grade range between Kindergarten and grade 12. The test is available in English and Spanish.

The most recent version of this test, created by Frederick C. Markwardt Jr. and published by Pearson American Guidance Service. is entitled Peabody Individual Achievement Test-Revised/Normative Update (PIAT-R/NU). It is individually administered and norm referenced. Administration time may vary depending on the age of the student but it takes approximately 60 minutes. The PIAT-R/NU assesses basic academic skills in the areas of general information, reading, writing, and mathematics.

== History ==
The original assessment, the Peabody Individual Achievement Test (PIAT) was published in 1970. The PIAT was later revised and in 1989 the PIAT-R was published which was the result of this revision.

The sample for the standardization of the PIAT-R was based on the 1985 U.S. Census. 1,563 students, ages 5–19 years old, from both public and private schools across the United States of America were included for the standardization. Students enrolled in special education classes were excluded from the sample. The sample was balanced by; sex, race and socioeconomic level.

Between the years of 1995-1996 the PIAT-R was restandardized as part of a renorming program which included other assessments in use at the time. The new version, PIAT-R/NU, included an older age group. The 18-22 year old group from the sample included students in high school, 2- year colleges, 4-year colleges, as well as some nonstudents.

== Test Format ==
The PIAT-R/NU is untimed and uses a flipbook. Use of calculators, pencils and paper are not required for the PIAT-R/NU subtests, with the exception of the Written Expression subtest. Most response formats only require pointing and multiple choices.

The PIAT-R/NU yields scores in 6 content areas used as a wide-range screening measure; 1) General Information: 100 verbal items assessing general knowledge, 2) Reading Recognition: 100 items measuring recognition of printed letters and ability to read words out loud, 3) Reading Comprehension: 100 items measuring reading comprehension, 4) Mathematics: 100 multiple choice items to test knowledge and application of Mathematical concepts and facts, 5) Spelling: 100 multiple choice items measuring recognition of correct spelling of words, 6) Written Expression: Assesses two levels of language skills. Level I: Kindergarten & Grade 1 measures pre-writing skills. Level II: Grades 2-12, asks students to write a story about a picture.

The test provides nine scores, one for each of the six subtests, plus Total Test score, Written Language score (Spelling & Written Expression subtests), and a Total Reading score (combination of Reading Recognition and Reading Comprehension). The six subtests are administered in the order they are presented in the flipbook (General Information, Reading Recognition, Reading Comprehension, Mathematics, Spelling, and Written Expression).

The PIAT-R/NU test is accompanied by a manual which provides grade and age equivalent scores. The modern version also comes with a software program called PIAT-R ASSIST which processes the raw scores and produces various reports, including age and grade equivalents, standard scores by age and grade, percentile ranks, and derived scores for Written Expression subtests and Written Language composite.

== Psychometric Properties ==
The PIAT-R has been extensively tested, and has been shown to be a stable evaluation of achievement. Preliminary versions of the test were tried out and empirical analyses of the results of those versions led to selection of the final items. Construct validity was established through developmental changes (test scores increasing with age or grade reflecting developmental changes), correlations with other tests, and factor analysis.

== Uses ==
The PIAT-R/NU can be used as a wide range screening measure of academic achievement for children in Kindergarten through grade 12. It is also useful for identifying individual strengths and weaknesses.

Clinical psychologists, counselors, learning specialists and others to can use the PIAT-R/NU to identify specific learning disabilities, evaluate programs, and support planning for instructional programs. It does not, however, provide formal diagnostic information.

The PIAT-R has also been used in research studies. Jackson, Davis, Murphy, Bairnsfather, and George (1994) used the PIAT-R to assess reading ability in their study of objective reading ability in older patients.

Another achievement test which is sometimes used instead of the PIAT-R is the Wechsler Individual Achievement Test - Third Edition. Each test has its particular strengths and weaknesses.
