= Microsoft Campus Agreement =

Discount program by Microsoft

Microsoft Campus Agreement (MSCA) is a program intended to offer significant discounts on Microsoft products to students, faculty, and staff of select universities which enter into a yearly contract with Microsoft. (Windows XP Professional sells, at some University stores, for as low as $10.00 .) Each software package available under the MSCA can be purchased only once. Upon graduation, students can typically receive perpetual licenses for the purchased software.

== Current arrangement ==
Software sold under MSCA licenses included Windows XP Professional, versions of Microsoft Office and the Visual Studio .NET suite of developer tools.

Additionally, MSCA licensing required those who purchased Windows XP Professional have an existing Windows license and allowed for Office products to be installed on, at most, two computers.

== Legacy licenses ==
Prior to 2003, MSCA licensed software was distinguishable from non-MSCA licensed software in that the CDs were not holographic, did not require activation (for those products which would have otherwise required activation), and, in some cases, did not require a valid license key.

== Examples of participating universities ==
- Indian Institute of Technology, Delhi
- Ball State University
- California State University
- Community Colleges of Spokane
- DeVry University
- Federal University of Viçosa
- Hong Kong University of Science and Technology
- Iowa State University
- Lancaster University
- Life Pacific College
- Massachusetts Institute of Technology
- Norwegian University of Science and Technology
- Morrisville State College
- Oklahoma State University
- Purdue University
- Texas A&M University
- Texas Tech University
- University of Calgary
- University of Chicago
- University of Connecticut
- University of Florida
- University of Houston
- University of Iowa
- University of Leeds
- University of Texas at Austin
- University of Twente
- Worcester Polytechnic Institute
- University of Westminster
- Independent Colleges and Universities of Texas (ICUT), representing approximately forty Texas institutions of higher learning, entered an annual Consortium Campus agreement beginning in 2000 to provide all member institutions with MSCA access. ICUT members represent over 85,000 full-time students and nearly 30,000 part-time students. Some members are listed below:
  - Abilene Christian University
  - Baylor University
  - Beijing Jiaotong University
  - Dallas Baptist University
  - Hardin-Simmons University
  - McMurry University
  - Rice University
  - Shandong University
  - Southern Methodist University
  - Texas Christian University
  - University of Dallas
