= Wechsler Preschool and Primary Scale of Intelligence =

IQ test for children

The Wechsler Preschool and Primary Scale of Intelligence (WPPSI) is an intelligence test designed for children ages 2 years 6 months to 7 years 7 months developed by David Wechsler in 1967. It is a descendant of the earlier Wechsler Adult Intelligence Scale and the Wechsler Intelligence Scale for Children tests. Since its original publication the WPPSI has been revised three times: in 1989, 2002, followed by the UK version in 2003, and 2012. The latest version, WPPSI–IV, published by Pearson Education, is a revision of the WPPSI-R (Wechsler, 1989) and the WPPSI-III (Wechsler, 2002). It provides subtest and composite scores that represent intellectual functioning in verbal and performance cognitive domains, as well as providing a composite score that represents a child's general intellectual ability (i.e., Full Scale IQ).

== History ==
The original WPPSI (Wechsler, 1967) was developed as an intelligence measure for 4-6:6yr olds in response to an increasing need for the assessment of preschoolers. The WPPSI was divided into eleven subtests, all of which were retained in the revision in 1989. The WPPSI-R expanded the age range to 3–7 years 3 months and introduced a new subtest, Object Assembly. WPPSI-III incorporates a number of significant changes. Additional subtests have been designed to enhance the measurement of Fluid Reasoning (see Carroll, 1997) these are; Matrix Reasoning, Picture Concepts and Word Reasoning. Measures of Processing Speed have also been taken from the WISC-III, adapted for use with younger children and included as new subtests (Coding & Symbol Search). The age range was lowered to 2 years 6 months, and was divided into two bands: 2 years 6 months - 3 years 11 months and 4–7 years 3 months, this was done in recognition of the substantial changes in cognitive development that occur during early childhood. The WPPSI-IV raised the upper end of the age range to 7 years and 7 months and also added the new Working Memory subtests of Picture Memory and Zoo Locations and the new Processing Speed subtests of Bug Search, Animal Coding, and Cancellation. It also simplified and shortened instructions.

== Test format ==
The Wechsler Preschool and Primary Scale of Intelligence consist of 15 subtests. They are designated as one of three types: core, supplemental, or optional. The core subtests are required for the computation of the Verbal, Performance, and Full Scale IQ. The supplemental subtests provide additional information about cognitive abilities or can be used as replacement for inappropriate subtests. The optional subtests provide additional information about cognitive functioning but cannot be used as replacements for core subtests.

- Block Design - while viewing a constructed model or a picture in a stimulus book, the child uses one- or two-color blocks to re-create the design within a specified time limit.
- Information - for Picture Items, the child responds to a question by choosing a picture from four response options. For Verbal Items, the child answers questions that address a broad range of general knowledge topics.
- Matrix Reasoning - the child looks at an incomplete matrix and selects the missing portion from 4 or 5 response options.
- Bug Search - the child uses an ink dauber to mark the image of a bug in the search group that matches the target bug.
- Picture Memory - the child is presented with a stimulus page of one or more pictures for a specific time and then selects the picture from options on a response page.
- Similarities - the child is read an incomplete sentence containing two concepts that share a common characteristic. The child is asked to complete the sentence by providing a response that reflects the shared characteristic.
- Picture Concepts - the child is presented with two or three rows of pictures and chooses one picture from each row to form a group with a common characteristic.
- Cancellation - the child scans two arrangements of objects and marks target objects.
- Zoo Locations - the child views one or more animal cards placed on a zoo layout and then places each card in the previously displayed locations.
- Object Assembly - the child is presented with the pieces of a puzzle in a standard arrangement and fits the pieces together to form a meaningful whole within 90 seconds.
- Vocabulary - for Picture Items, the child names pictures that are displayed in a stimulus book. For Verbal Items, the child gives definitions for words that the examiner reads aloud.
- Animal Coding - the child marks shapes that correspond to pictured animals.
- Comprehension - the child answers questions based on his or her understanding of general principles and social situations.
- Receptive Vocabulary - the child looks at a group of four pictures and points to the one the examiner names aloud.
- Picture Naming - the child names pictures that are displayed in a stimulus book.

The WPPSI–IV provides Verbal and Performance IQ scores as well as a Full Scale IQ score. In addition, the Processing Speed Quotient (known as the Processing Speed Index on previous Wechsler scales) can be derived for children aged 4 – 7 years 3 months, and a General Language Composite can be determined for children in both age bands (2 years 6 months – 3 years 11 months & 4–7 years 3 months). Children in the 2 years 6 months – 3 years 11 months age band are administered only five of the subtests: Receptive Vocabulary, Block Design, Information, Object Assembly, and Picture Naming.

Quotient and Composite scores have a mean of 100 and a standard deviation of 15. Subtest scaled scores have a mean of 10 and a standard deviation of 3. For Quotient and Composite score:

Below 70 is Extremely Low,
70-79 is Borderline,
80-89 is Low Average,
90-109 is Average,
110-119 is High Average,
120-129 is Superior,
130 and up is Very Superior.

This is true for most Wechsler Scales with the exception of the WIAT-III.

== Uses ==
The WPPSI can be used in several ways, for example:

- As an assessment of general intellectual functioning.
- As part of an assessment to identify intellectual giftedness.
- To identify cognitive delay and learning difficulties.

The clinical utility of the WPPSI-III can be improved and a richer picture of general function achieved when combined with other assessments. For example, when paired with the Children's Memory Scale (CMS: Cohen, 1997) a measure of learning and memory functioning in children or the WIAT-II a measure of academic achievement, information can be gained on both cognitive ability and academic achievement in young children. Combinations such as these would potentially be of use in educational settings and inform educational interventions. A further potentially useful pairing includes the used of the Adaptive Behavior Assessment System (ABAS; Harrison & Oakland, 2003); this pairing can result in information on cognitive and adaptive functioning, both of which are required for a proper diagnosis of learning difficulties. The Wechsler tests can also be used to identify intellectual giftedness, and are commonly accepted as qualifying evidence for high-IQ societies, such as Intertel and Mensa.

However, it is important to consider and recognise the limitations of using assessments. Some studies show that intelligence tests such as the WPPSI-III, especially for pre-K level, are unreliable and their results vary widely with various factors such as retesting, practice (familiarization), test administrator, time and place. There are claims that some commercially available materials improve results simply by eliminating negative factors through familiarization which in turn puts children at a comfortable frame of mind.

== Psychometric properties ==
The US standardisation of the WPPSI-III included 1,700 children aged 2 years 6 months – 7 years 3 months. The reliability coefficients for the WPPSI-III US composite scales range from .89 to .95. The UK sample for the WPPSI-III was collected between 2002–2003 and contained 805 children in an attempt to accurately represent the most current UK population of children aged 2 years 6 months to 7 years 3 months according to the 2001 UK census data. The UK validation project was conducted at City University under the direction of Professor John Rust.

The WPPSI-III has been formally linked with the WIAT-II (The Psychological Corporation, 2001). The relationship between the WPPSI-III and the WPPSI-R, WISC-III, BSID-II, DAS, WIAT-II and CMS was also explored in order to evaluate the assessment's reliability. A number of special group studies were also carried out during standardisation in order to improve the clinical utility of the tool. These studies included children with intellectual disability, developmental delay, language disorders, motor impairment, ADHD and those classed as gifted.

== Translations ==
The WPPSI-III has been translated and adapted for use with different populations including Spanish, French (and French Canadian), German, Italian, Swedish, Korean, Taiwanese (Chinese version), Japanese, Canadian, Australian, Dutch, Norwegian and Hebrew.

== See also ==
- Wechsler Intelligence Scale for Children (WISC)
- Wechsler Adult Intelligence Scale (WAIS)
- Harcourt Assessment
