= McCarthy Scales of Children's Abilities =

Psychological test given to young children

The McCarthy Scales of Children's Abilities (MSCA) is a psychological test given to young children. "the McCarthy scales present a carefully constructed individual test of human ability."

== Beginnings ==
The McCarthy Scales of Children's Abilities was created by Dorothea McCarthy in 1972. However, McCarthy died shortly after the test was actually published, so the refining and strengthening of the McCarthy scales has fallen to interested researchers.

== Overview ==
William Van Ornum, Linda Dunlap, and Milton Shore provide a detailed description of the McCarthy Scales of Children's Abilities in Psychological Testing Across the Lifespan. Van Ornum et al. (2008) emphasize that a key contribution of McCarthy was creating a test measuring "cognitive ability" rather than "intelligence." By doing so, interpretation of the test need not enter the sometimes excoriating debates regarding intelligence, genetics, lifelong proclivity, etc. Rather, the scores can be simply stated as "strengths" and "weaknesses." A T-score with a mean of 50 and SD of 10 is used so these scores will not be interpreted as IQ scores by teachers and parents. Van Ornum has commented: "This is one of the best tests ever created for children. It's fun and engaging, with pictures, a hopping game, and even a xylophone!"

The McCarthy Scales of Children's Abilities was intended to measure children from ages 2 to 8. The scale is very sound, and if there was more validity data, it could have very well obtained the same status as the Wechsler Intelligence Scale for Children. In fact, the Wechsler scale actually overlaps the McCarthy's age range. Further, The McCarthy Scales of Children's Abilities does seem to offer certain advantages over the WPPSI-III and also the Stanford–Binet Intelligence Scales for the 2 to 8 year old range.

The test produces both a pattern of scores as well as a variety of composite scores, which is a plus. This allows analyzing of both individual sections as well as the overall test. In fact, the concept of combining various subtests to form a composite score is such an important idea that it has become one of the main features in the 2003 fifth edition of the Stanford-Binet scale.

The essence of the test is based on a wide variety of functions that have been long held to be related to human intelligence. There are 18 tests in the battery that sample these different functions, 15 of which are combined into a composite score which is known as the general cognitive index (CGI). This section has a standard score with a mean of 100 and a standard deviation of 16.

In general, The psychometric properties of the scale are good, with evidence of factorial validity and predictive validity. "The reliability coefficients for the general cognitive index tend to run in the low 90's" , and the data for validity is encouraging as well. Correlations have been found with the Stanford-Binet scale (Form L-M) and the WPPSI: "the general cognitive index correlates at .81 with the Binet IQ and at .71 with the WPPSI full-scale IQ." Additionally, the manual for the test provides additionally validity coefficients, although based on small samples.

The McCarthy Scales of Children's Abilities breaks down into two main sub-parts

In the General Cognitive Index (CGI):

Verbal Scale:

- Pictorial Memory
- Word Knowledge
- Verbal Memory I
- Verbal Memory II
- Verbal Fluency
- Opposite Analogies

Perceptual-performance:

- Block Building
- Puzzle Solving
- Tapping Sequence
- Right-Left Orientation
- Draw-a-design
- Draw-a-child
- Conceptual Grouping

Quantitative:

- Number Questions
- Numerical Memory I
- Numerical Memory II
- Counting and Sorting

In the Additional Scales:

Memory:

- Pictorial Memory
- Tapping Sequence
- Verbal Memory I and II
- Numerical Memory I and II

Motor:

- Leg Coordination
- Arm Coordination
- Imitative Action
- Draw-a-design
- Draw-a-child

== Uses ==
The McCarthy Scales of Children's Abilities has been used in many different research studies: ". . . use to evaluate the effects of nutritional supplements given to nursing mothers on the development of the nursing infants, the effects of air-pollution on children's cognitive developments, and the effects of early intervention on the cognitive development of preterm infants." Additionally, the McCarthy Scales have been used to "evaluate the relationship between autism and intelligence in a longitudinal study of over 8000 twin pairs." This study produced findings that suggested that "individual differences in autistic traits are substantially genetically independent of intellectual functioning."

Another longitudinal study that made use of the McCarthy Scale "evaluated the effects of early intervention on the development of children worldwide. The study found that children from different contexts and countries receive substantial cognitive, behavioral, health, and schooling benefits from early childhood interventions."

One study used the McCarthy scale to "show positive effects of parental cognitive stimulation and emotional support on children's cognitive abilities." Another study used the McCarthy Scale to "show that pre-term birth, parental age, and infant gender accounted for more than 30% of the variance in cognitive-motor skills." Still another study used the McCarthy Scale to "assess the effect of the mode of delivery (vaginal or caesarean section) on the long-term psychomotor development of extremely low-birth weight infants."
