= Wechsler Adult Intelligence Scale =

IQ test designed to measure intelligence in adults

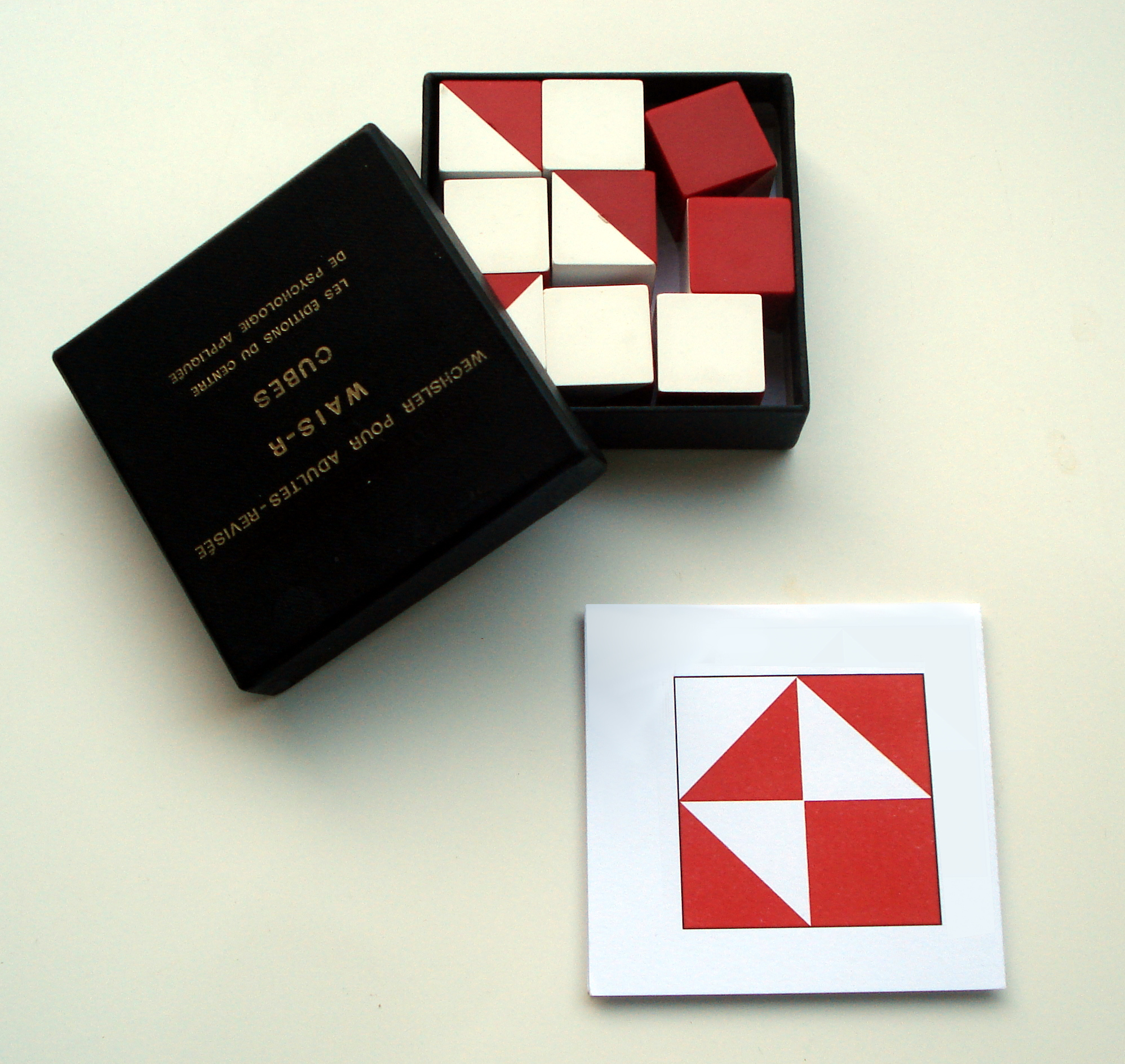
- Cubes and a target pattern of the WAIS-R's "Block Design" test. The example figure is not one of the items to be completed.
- Synonyms: WAIS
- ICD-9-CM: 94.01
- MeSH: D014888

The Wechsler Adult Intelligence Scale (WAIS) is an IQ test designed to measure intelligence and cognitive ability in adults and older adolescents. For children between the ages of 6 and 16, Wechsler Intelligence Scale for Children (WISC) is commonly used.

The original WAIS (Form I) was published in February 1955 by David Wechsler, Chief Psychologist at Bellevue Hospital (1932–1967) in New York City, as a revision of the Wechsler–Bellevue Intelligence Scale released in 1939. It is currently in its fifth edition (WAIS-5), released in 2024 by Pearson. It is the most widely used IQ test, for both adults and older adolescents, in the world.

== History ==
The WAIS was founded to get to know Wechsler's patients at Bellevue Hospital and on his definition of intelligence, which he defined as "... the global capacity of a person to act purposefully, to think rationally, and to deal effectively with his environment." He believed that intelligence was made up of specific elements that could be isolated, defined, and subsequently measured. However, these individual elements were not entirely independent, but were all interrelated. His argument, in other words, is that general intelligence is composed of various specific and interrelated functions or elements that can be individually measured.

This theory differed greatly from the Binet-Simon Intelligence Test which, in Wechsler's day, was generally considered the supreme authority with regard to intelligence testing. A drastically revised new version of the Binet scale, released in 1937, received a great deal of criticism from David Wechsler (after whom the original Wechsler–Bellevue Intelligence scale and the subsequent Wechsler Scales are named).

- Wechsler was a very influential advocate for the concept of non-intellective factors, and he felt that the 1937 Binet scale did not do a good job of incorporating these factors into the scale (non-intellective factors are variables that contribute to the overall score in intelligence, but are not made up of intelligence-related items. These include things such as lack of confidence, fear of failure, attitudes, etc.).
- Wechsler did not agree with the idea of a single score that the Binet test gave.
- Wechsler argued that the Binet scale items were not valid for adult test-takers because the items were chosen specifically for use with children.
- The "Binet scale's emphasis on speed, with timed tasks scattered throughout the scale, tended to unduly handicap older adults."
- Wechsler believed that "mental age norms clearly did not apply to adults."
- Wechsler criticized the then existing Binet scale because "it did not consider that intellectual performance could deteriorate as a person grew older."

These criticisms of the 1937 Binet test helped produce the Wechsler–Bellevue scale, released in 1939. However, the present-day WAIS-IV has contradicted many of these criticisms, by incorporating a single overall score, using multiple timed tasks, focusing on intellective items and other ways. While this scale has been revised (resulting in the present day WAIS-IV), many of the original concepts Wechsler argued for have become standards in psychological testing, including the point-scale concept and the performance-scale concept.

== Wechsler–Bellevue Intelligence Scale ==
The Wechsler–Bellevue tests were innovative in the 1930s because they:

1. gathered tasks created for nonclinical purposes for administration as a "clinical test battery",
2. used the point scale concept instead of the age scale, and
3. included a non-verbal performance scale.

=== Point scale concept ===
In the Binet scales (prior to the 1986 version) items were grouped according to age level. Each of these age levels was composed of a group of tasks that could be passed by two-thirds to three-quarters of the individuals in that level. This meant that items were not arranged according to content. Additionally, an individual taking a Binet test would only receive credit if a certain number of the tasks were completed. This meant that falling short just one task required for the credit, resulted in no credit at all (for example, if passing three out of four tasks was required to receive credit, then passing two yielded no credit).

The point scale concept significantly changed the way testing was done by assigning credits or points to each item. This had two large effects. First, this allowed items to be grouped according to content. Second, participants were able to receive a set number of points or credits for each item passed. The result was a test that could be made up of different content areas (or subtests) with both an overall score and a score for each content area. In turn, this allowed for an analysis to be made of an individual's ability in a variety of content areas (as opposed to one general score).

=== The Non-Verbal Performance Scale ===
The non-verbal performance scale was also a critical difference from the Binet scale. The earlier Binet scale had been persistently and consistently criticized for its emphasis on language and verbal skills. Wechsler designed an entire scale that allowed the measurement of non-verbal intelligence. This became known as a performance scale. This scale required a subject to actively do something, such as copying symbols or pointing to a missing detail in a picture, rather than just answering questions. This was an important development, as it attempted to overcome biases that were caused by "language, culture, and education." Further, this scale also provided an opportunity to observe a different type of behavior, because something physical was required. Clinicians were able to observe how a participant reacted to the "longer interval of sustained effort, concentration, and attention" that the performance tasks required.

As the Wechsler–Bellevue scale was the first to effectively use the performance scale, it also introduced the "possibility of directly comparing an individual's verbal and nonverbal intelligence". This was possible as "the results of both scales were expressed in comparable units". The Binet scale did have performance tasks, but they were geared toward younger children. The Wechsler-Bellevue was also unique in that there were entire tests that were considered supplements or alternatives, including "performance" measures such as the Leiter International Performance Scale.

== WAIS ==
The WAIS was initially created as a revision of the Wechsler–Bellevue Intelligence Scale (WBIS), which was a battery of tests published by Wechsler in 1939. The WBIS was composed of subtests that could be found in various other intelligence tests of the time, such as Robert Yerkes' army testing program and the Binet-Simon scale. The WAIS was first released in February 1955 by David Wechsler. Because the Wechsler tests included non-verbal items (known as performance scales) as well as verbal items for all test-takers, and because the 1960 form of Lewis Terman's Stanford–Binet Intelligence Scales was less carefully developed than previous versions, Form I of the WAIS surpassed the Stanford–Binet tests in popularity by the 1960s.

== WAIS-R ==
The WAIS-R, a revised form of the WAIS, was released in 1981 and consisted of six verbal and five performance subtests. The verbal tests were: Information, Comprehension, Arithmetic, Digit Span, Similarities, and Vocabulary. The Performance subtests were: Picture Arrangement, Picture Completion, Block Design, Object Assembly, and Digit Symbol. A verbal IQ, performance IQ and full scale IQ were obtained.

This revised edition did not provide new validity data, but used the data from the original WAIS; however new norms were provided, carefully stratified.

== WAIS-III ==
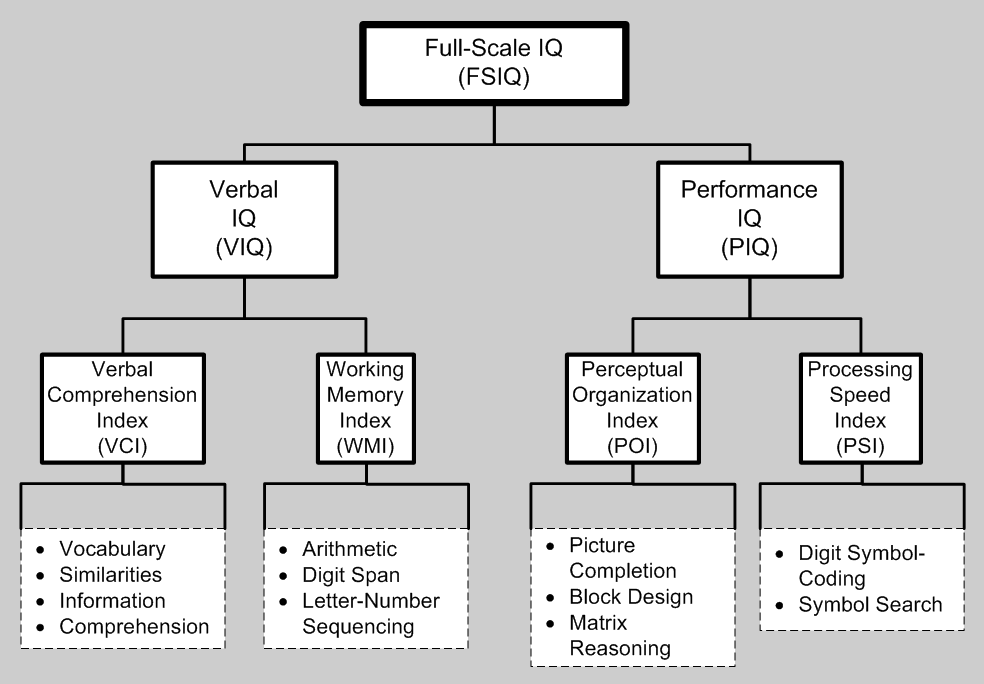

The WAIS-III, a subsequent revision of the WAIS and the WAIS-R, was released in 1997. It provided scores for Verbal IQ, Performance IQ, and Full Scale IQ, along with four secondary indices (Verbal Comprehension, Working Memory, Perceptual Organization, and Processing Speed).

== WAIS-IV ==
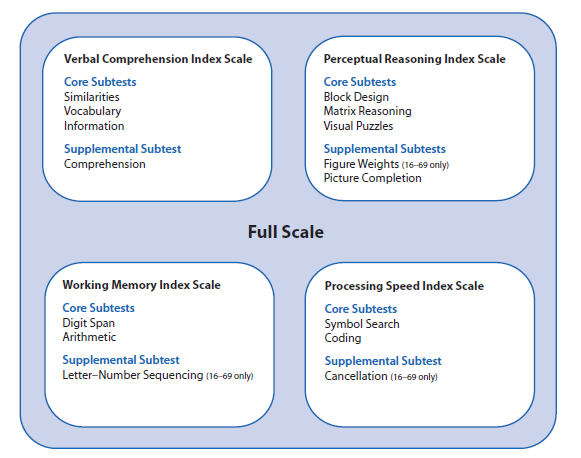

The previous version of the test, the WAIS-IV, which was released in 2008, is composed of 10 core subtests and five supplemental subtests, with the 10 core subtests yielding scaled scores that sum to derive the Full Scale IQ. With the WAIS-IV, the verbal/performance IQ scores from previous versions were removed and replaced by the index scores. The General Ability Index (GAI) was included, which consists of the Similarities, Vocabulary and Information subtests from the Verbal Comprehension Index and the Block Design, Matrix Reasoning and Visual Puzzles subtests from the Perceptual Reasoning Index. The GAI is clinically useful because it can be used as a measure of cognitive abilities that are less vulnerable to impairments of processing speed and working memory. There are several notable features in this version of the intelligence scale that make it unique from previous versions. Some of these changes include the removal of Picture Arrangement, Object Assembly, Mazes, Verbal IQ, and Performance IQ and the addition of five subtests that emphasize fluid reasoning and/or working memory.

=== Index scores and scales ===
There are four index scores representing major components of intelligence:

- Verbal Comprehension Index (VCI)
- Perceptual Reasoning Index (PRI)
- Working Memory Index (WMI)
- Processing Speed Index (PSI)

Two broad scores, which can be used to summarize general intellectual ability, can also be derived:

- Full Scale IQ (FSIQ), based on the total combined performance of the VCI, PRI, WMI, and PSI. The WAIS-IV can generate an FSIQ in the range of 40 to 160.
- General Ability Index (GAI), based only on the six subtests that the VCI and PRI comprise; it is intended to portray a snapshot of general intelligence that is less influenced by working memory and processing speed demands.

WAIS-IV subtests grouped by index
Index	Subtest	Core?	Description	Proposed abilities measured
Verbal Comprehension	Similarities	Yes	Describe how two words or concepts are similar.	Abstract verbal reasoning; semantic knowledge
Verbal Comprehension	Vocabulary	Yes	Name objects in pictures or define words presented to them.	Semantic knowledge; verbal comprehension and expression
Verbal Comprehension	Information	Yes	General knowledge questions	Degree of general information acquired from culture
Verbal Comprehension	Comprehension	No	Questions about social situations or common concepts.	Ability to express abstract social conventions, rules and expressions
Perceptual Reasoning	Block Design	Yes	Put together red-and-white blocks in a pattern according to a displayed model. This is timed, and some of the more difficult puzzles award bonuses for speed.	Visual spatial processing and problem solving; visual motor construction
Perceptual Reasoning	Matrix Reasoning	Yes	View an array of pictures with one missing square, and select the picture that fits the array from five options.	Nonverbal abstract problem solving, inductive reasoning
Perceptual Reasoning	Visual Puzzles	Yes	View a puzzle in a stimulus book and choose from among pieces of which three could construct the puzzle	Visual spatial reasoning
Perceptual Reasoning	Picture Completion	No	Select the missing part of a picture	Ability to quickly perceive visual details
Perceptual Reasoning	Figure Weights	No	View a stimulus book that pictures shapes on a scale (or scales) with one empty side and select the choice that keeps the scale balanced	Quantitative reasoning
Working Memory	Digit Span	Yes	Listen to sequences of numbers orally and to repeat them as heard, in reverse order, and in ascending order.	Working memory, attention, encoding, auditory processing
Working Memory	Arithmetic	Yes	Orally administered arithmetic word problems. Timed.	Quantitative reasoning, concentration, mental manipulation
Working Memory	Letter-Number Sequencing	No	Recall a series of numbers in increasing order and letters in alphabetical order.	Working memory, attention, mental control
Processing Speed	Symbol Search	Yes	View rows of symbols and target symbols, and mark whether or not the target symbols appear in each row.	Processing speed
Processing Speed	Coding	Yes	Transcribe a digit-symbol code using a key. The task is time-limited.	Processing speed, associative memory, graphomotor speed
Processing Speed	Cancellation	No	Scan arrangements of shapes and mark specific target shapes within a limited amount of time	Processing speed

=== Standardization ===
The WAIS-IV was standardized on a sample of 2,200 people in the United States, ranging in age from 16 to 90. The demographic characteristics of the sample were modeled after the proportions of different groups in an analysis of data from the U.S. Census Bureau. An extension of the standardization has been conducted with 688 Canadians in the same age range.

== WAIS-5 ==
The fifth edition of the Wechsler Adult Intelligence Scale was released in late 2024. Normative data were collected in 2023–24 on a U.S. Census-reflective sample that was conormed on the Wechsler Memory Scale: Fifth Edition.

The WAIS-5 introduces several new subtests, particularly in the working memory domain, with Digit Span Sequencing and Running Digits now being the core subtests that compose the Working Memory Index. Digit Span Forward, Digit Span Backward, Spatial Addition, Symbol Span, and Letter-Number Sequencing may also be used to construct the Expanded Working Memory Index.

The Perceptual Reasoning Index has been split into Visual Spatial Ability (Block Design, Visual Puzzles) and Fluid Reasoning (Matrix Reasoning, Figure Weights). A complementary Fluid Reasoning subtest Set Relations was also introduced, as well as an additional Processing Speed subtest Naming Speed Quantity, which was originally featured in the WISC-V.

The Full Scale Intelligence Quotient is now generated from only seven subtests (Similarities, Vocabulary, Block Design, Matrix Reasoning, Figure Weights, Digit Span Sequencing, Coding), similar to the WISC-V. Fifteen ancillary index scores, including the General Ability Index, are also present.

Administration is anticipated to be shorter than the WAIS-IV, especially for those who are suspected as being intellectually gifted. The test may be administered in the classic physical format or on a digital platform.

== Age range and uses ==
The WAIS-IV measure is acceptable for use with people who are 16–90 years of age. For people younger than 16, the Wechsler Preschool and Primary Scale of Intelligence (WPPSI, 2½–7 years, 7 months) and the Wechsler Intelligence Scale for Children (WISC, 6–16 years) are used.

Intelligence tests may be used to assess the level of cognitive functioning in individuals with psychiatric illness or brain injury. Rehabilitation psychologists and neuropsychologists use neuropsychological tests (including the WAIS-IV) to assess how the individual's brain is functioning after it has been injured. Specific subtests can provide insight into specific cognitive functions; for example, the digit span subtest could be used to look for attentional difficulties.

The Wechsler tests can also be used to identify intellectual giftedness, and are commonly accepted as qualifying evidence for high-IQ societies, such as Mensa, Intertel and the Triple Nine Society.

== WASI-II ==
The Wechsler Abbreviated Scale of Intelligence – 2nd edition (WASI-II) is a short psychological test that was developed in 2011 by Pearson to estimate intellectual functioning in a shorter period of time than the WAIS-IV. The WASI-II only has 4 subtests: Block Design, Vocabulary, Similarities, and Matrix Reasoning, compared to the 10 core subtests that are present in the WAIS-IV. These 4 subtests have the same structure as the similarly-named subtests on the WAIS-IV, but have different questions.

The WASI-II can derive 4 composite scores from a combination of the 4 subtests. A Verbal Comprehension Index (VCI) can be derived from the raw scores on the Vocabulary and Similarities subtests. A Perceptual Reasoning Index (PRI) can be derived from the raw scores on the Matrix Reasoning and Block Design subtests. A Full Scale IQ-2 (FSIQ-2) can be derived from the raw scores on the Matrix Reasoning and Vocabulary subtests, while a Full Scale IQ-4 (FSIQ-4) can be derived from the raw scores on all 4 subtests.

WASI-II Subtests grouped by index

Index	Subtest	Description	Proposed abilities measured
Verbal Comprehension	Similarities	Describe how two words or concepts are similar.	Abstract verbal reasoning; semantic knowledge
Verbal Comprehension	Vocabulary	Name objects in pictures or define words presented to them.	Semantic knowledge; verbal comprehension and expression
Perceptual Reasoning	Block Design	Put together red-and-white blocks in a pattern according to a displayed model. This is timed, and some of the more difficult puzzles award bonuses for speed.	Visual spatial processing and problem solving; visual motor construction
Perceptual Reasoning	Matrix Reasoning	View an array of pictures with one missing square, and select the picture that fits the array from five options.	Nonverbal abstract problem solving, inductive reasoning

== See also ==
- Wechsler Intelligence Scale for Children
- Wechsler Preschool and Primary Scale of Intelligence
