= Wechsler Intelligence Scale for Children =

Popular IQ test for children

The Wechsler Intelligence Scale for Children (WISC) is an individually administered intelligence test for children between the ages of 6 and 16. The Fifth Edition (WISC-V; Wechsler, 2014) is the most recent version.

The WISC-V takes 45 to 65 minutes to administer. It generates a Full Scale IQ (formerly known as an intelligence quotient or IQ score) that represents a child's general intellectual ability. It also provides five primary index scores, namely Verbal Comprehension Index, Visual Spatial Index, Fluid Reasoning Index, Working Memory Index, and Processing Speed Index. These indices represent a child's abilities in discrete cognitive domains. Five ancillary composite scores can be derived from various combinations of primary or primary and secondary subtests.

Five complementary subtests yield three complementary composite scores to measure related cognitive abilities. Technical papers by the publishers support other indices such as VECI, EFI, and GAI (Raiford et al., 2015). Variation in testing procedures and goals resulting in prorated score combinations or single indices can reduce time or increase testing time to three or more hours for an extended battery, including all primary, ancillary, and complementary indices.

== History ==
The original WISC (Wechsler, 1949), developed by the Romanian-American psychologist David Wechsler, Ph.D., was an adaptation of several of the subtests that made up the Wechsler-Bellevue Intelligence Scale (Wechsler, 1939), but also featured several subtests designed specifically for it. The subtests were organized into Verbal and Performance scales and provided scores for Verbal IQ (VIQ), Performance IQ (PIQ), and Full Scale IQ (FSIQ).

Each successive edition has been re-normed to compensate for the Flynn effect, ensuring not only that the norms do not become outdated, which is suggested to result in inflated scores on intelligence measures, but that they are representative of the current population (Flynn, 1984, 1987, 1999; Matarazzo, 1972). Additional updates and refinements include changes to the questions to make them less biased against minorities and females and updated materials to make them more useful in the administration of the test. A revised edition was published in 1974 as the WISC-R (Wechsler, 1974), featuring the same subtests. However, the age range was changed from 5–15 to 6–16.

The third edition was published in 1991 (WISC-III; Wechsler, 1991) and brought with it a new subtest as a measure of processing speed. In addition to VIQ, PIQ, and FSIQ scores, four new index scores were introduced: the Verbal Comprehension Index (VCI), the Perceptual Organization Index (POI), the Freedom from Distractibility Index (FDI), and the Processing Speed Index (PSI).

The WISC-IV was produced in 2003. The WISC-V was published in 2014. The WISC-V has a total of 21 subtests. It yields 15 composite scores.

== Test format ==
The WISC is one test in a suite of Wechsler intelligence scales. Subjects 16 and over are tested with the Wechsler Adult Intelligence Scale (WAIS), and children ages two and half years to seven years and seven months are tested with the Wechsler Preschool and Primary Scale of Intelligence (WPPSI). There is some overlap between tests: children aged 6 years 0 months through 7 years 7 months can complete the WPPSI or the WISC; children aged 16 can complete the WISC-V or the WAIS-IV. Different floor effect and ceiling effect can be achieved using the different tests, allowing for a greater understanding of the child's abilities or deficits. This means that a 16-year-old adolescent who has an intellectual disability may be tested using the WISC-V so that the clinician may see the floor of their knowledge (the lowest level).

There are five primary index scores, the Verbal Comprehension Index (VCI), Visual Spatial Index (VSI), Fluid Reasoning Index (FRI), Working Memory Index (WMI), and Processing Speed Index (PSI). Two subtests must be administered to obtain each of the primary index scores. The Full Scale IQ is derived from 7 of the 10 primary subtests: Both Verbal Comprehension subtests, one Visual Spatial subtest, two Fluid Reasoning subtests, one Working Memory subtest, and one Processing Speed subtest. Verbal Comprehension and Fluid Reasoning are weighted more heavily in the Full Scale IQ to reflect the importance of crystallized and fluid abilities in modern intelligence models (Wechsler, 2014).

The VCI is derived from the Similarities and Vocabulary subtests. The Verbal Comprehension scale subtests are described below:

- Similarities – (primary, FSIQ) asking how two words are alike/similar.
- Vocabulary – (primary, FSIQ) examinee is asked to define a provided word
- Information (secondary) – general knowledge questions.
- Comprehension – (secondary) questions about social situations or common concepts.

The VCI is an overall measure of verbal concept formation (the child's ability to verbally reason) and is influenced by semantic knowledge.

The VSI is derived from the Block Design and Visual Puzzles subtests. These subtests are as follows:

- Block Design (primary, FSIQ) – children put together red-and-white blocks in a pattern according to a displayed model. This is timed, and some of the more difficult puzzles award bonuses for speed.
- Visual Puzzles (primary) – children view a puzzle in a stimulus book and choose from among pieces of which three could construct the puzzle.

The VSI is a measure of visual spatial processing.

The FRI is derived from the Matrix Reasoning and Figure Weights subtests. The Fluid Reasoning scale subtests are described below:

- Matrix Reasoning (primary, FSIQ) – children are shown an array of pictures with one missing square, and select the picture that fits the array from five options.
- Figure Weights (primary, FSIQ) – children view a stimulus book that pictures shapes on a scale (or scales) with one empty side and select the choice that keeps the scale balanced.
- Picture Concepts (secondary) – children are provided with a series of pictures presented in rows (either two or three rows) and asked to determine which pictures go together, one from each row.
- Arithmetic (secondary) – orally administered arithmetic word problems. Timed.

The FRI is a measure of logical and quantitative reasoning.

The WMI is derived from the Digit Span and Picture Span subtests. The Working Memory scale's subtests are as follows:

- Digit Span (primary, FSIQ) – children listen to sequences of numbers orally and to repeat them as heard, in reverse order, and in ascending order.
- Picture Span (primary) – children view pictures in a stimulus book and select from options to indicate the pictures they saw, in order if possible.
- Letter-Number Sequencing (secondary) – children are provided a series of numbers and letters and asked to provide them to the examiner in a predetermined order.

The WMI is a measure of working memory ability.

The PSI is derived from the Coding and Symbol Search subtests. The Processing Speed subtests are as follows:

- Coding (primary, FSIQ) – children under 8 mark rows of shapes with different lines according to a code, children over 8 transcribe a digit-symbol code using a key. The task is time-limited.
- Symbol Search (primary) – children are given rows of symbols and target symbols, and asked to mark whether or not the target symbols appear in each row.
- Cancellation (secondary) – children scan random and structured arrangements of pictures and marks specific target pictures within a limited amount of time.

The PSI is a measure of processing speed.

The 2014 publication of the WISC-V contained five ancillary index scores that may be derived for special clinical purposes or situations: the Quantitative Reasoning Index (QRI), the Auditory Working Memory Index (AWMI), the Nonverbal Index (NVI), the General Ability Index (GAI), and the Cognitive Proficiency Index (CPI). Three of these ancillary index scores (NVI, GAI, and CPI) can be derived from the 10 primary subtests. The QRI and the AWMI can each be derived by administering one additional subtest from subtests that are within one of the five primary scales (Verbal Comprehension scale, Visual Spatial Index, Fluid Reasoning scale, Working Memory scale, and Processing Speed scale) but are not primary. The set of these subtests is termed secondary subtests (Wechsler, 2014).

Two ancillary index scores termed the expanded index scores were released the year after the 2014 publication, so are not included in the published manuals. These are the Verbal (Expanded Crystallized) Index (VECI) and the Expanded Fluid Index (EFI) (Raiford, Drozdick, Zhang, & Zhou, 2015).

Three complementary index scores are available to measure cognitive processes that are important to achievement and are sensitive to specific learning disabilities. The complementary index scores are the Naming Speed Index (NSI), designed to measure rapid automatized naming, and the Symbol Translation Index, designed to measure visual-verbal associative memory, which is sometimes termed visual-verbal paired associate learning in the published literature (Wechsler, 2014). The Naming Speed scale contains Naming Speed Literacy, which measures rapid automatic naming, and Naming Speed Quantity, which is the only commercially published and normed measure of rapid quantity naming, also known as subitizing. Naming Speed Quantity is uniquely sensitive to math achievement and specific learning disabilities in mathematics (Raiford et al., 2016; Wechsler, Raiford, & Holdnack, 2014).

== Psychometric properties ==
The WISC–V normative sample consisted of 2,200 children between the ages of 6 and 16 years 11 months. In addition to the normative sample, a number of special group samples were collected, including the following: children identified as intellectually gifted, children with mild or moderate intellectual disability, children with specific learning disorders (reading, written expression, and math), children with ADHD, children with disruptive behavior, children who are English Language Learners, children with autism spectrum disorder with language impairment, children with autism spectrum disorder without language impairment, and children with traumatic brain injuries.

The WISC–V is also linked with measures of achievement, adaptive behavior, executive function, and behavior and emotion. Equivalency studies were also conducted within the Wechsler family of tests and with a Kaufman test (the KABC-II) enabling comparisons between various intellectual ability scores over the lifespan. A number of concurrent studies were conducted to examine the scale's reliability and validity. Evidence of the convergent and discriminant validity of the WISC–V is provided by correlational studies with the following instruments: WISC–IV, WPPSI–IV, WAIS–IV, WASI–II, KABC–II, KTEA–3, WIAT–III, NEPSY–II, Vineland–II, and BASC–II. Evidence of construct validity was provided through a series of factor-analytic studies and mean comparisons using matched samples of special group and nonclinical children.

== Uses ==
The WISC is used not only as an intelligence test, but as a clinical tool. Some practitioners use the WISC as part of an assessment to diagnose attention-deficit hyperactivity disorder (ADHD) and learning disabilities, for example. This is usually done through a process called pattern analysis, in which the various subtests' scores are compared to one another (ipsative scoring) and clusters of unusually low scores in relation to the others are searched for. David Wechsler himself suggested this in 1958.

However, the research does not show this to be an effective way to diagnose ADHD or learning disabilities. The vast majority of children with ADHD do not display certain subtests substantially below others, and many children who display such patterns do not have ADHD. Other patterns for children with learning disabilities show a similar lack of usefulness of the WISC as a diagnostic tool.

When diagnosing children, best practice suggests that a multi-test battery, i.e., multi-factored evaluation, should be used as learning problems, attention, and emotional difficulties can have similar symptoms, co-occur, or reciprocally influence each other. For example, children with learning difficulties can become emotionally distraught and thus have concentration difficulties, begin to exhibit behavior problems, or both. Children with ADHD may show learning difficulties because of their attentional problems or also have learning disorder or disability (or have nothing else). In short, while diagnosis of any childhood or adult difficulty should never be made based on IQ alone (or interview, physician examination, parent report, other test etc. for that matter) the cognitive ability test can help rule out, in conjunction with other tests and sources of information, other explanations for problems, uncover co-morbid problems, and be a rich source of information when properly analyzed and care is taken to avoid relying simply on the single summary IQ score (Sattler, Dumont, & Coalson, 2016).

The WISC can be used to show discrepancies between a child's intelligence and his/her performance at school (and it is this discrepancy that school psychologists look for when using this test). In a clinical setting, learning disabilities can be diagnosed through a comparison of intelligence scores and scores on an achievement test, such as the Woodcock Johnson III or Wechsler Individual Achievement Test II. If a child's achievement is below what would be expected given their level of intellectual functioning (as derived from an IQ test such as the WISC-IV), then a learning disability may be present. Other psychologists and researchers believe that the WISC can be used to understand the complexities of the human mind by examining each subtest and can, indeed, help in diagnosing learning disabilities.

Subsequently, the WISC can be used as part of an assessment battery to identify intellectual giftedness, learning difficulties, and cognitive strengths and weaknesses. When combined with other measures such as the Adaptive Behavior Assessment System–II (ABAS–II; Harrison & Oakland, 2003) and the Children's Memory Scale (CMS; Cohen, 1997) its clinical utility can be enhanced. Combinations such as these provide information on cognitive and adaptive functioning, both of which are required for the proper diagnosis of learning difficulties and learning and memory functioning resulting in a richer picture of a child's cognitive functioning.

The WISC–V is linked with the Kaufman Test of Educational Achievement–Third Edition (KTEA–3; Kaufman & Kaufman, 2014) and the Wechsler Individual Achievement Test-4 (WIAT–4; Pearson, 2019), measures of academic achievement. This linkage offers insight into both cognitive ability and academic performance in children. Tests of intellectual functioning are widely used in schools to identify cognitive deficits contributing to low achievement and to predict future performance. Using the WISC–V in this way supports educational interventions addressing learning difficulties and cognitive deficits. In addition to diagnosing ADHD and learning disabilities, it informs tailored educational strategies. Research and practice recommend breaking material into smaller units, using visual aids, multisensory techniques, and manipulatives to improve learning outcomes, especially in mathematics for children with ADHD.

The WISC–V can also be used to assess a child's cognitive development, with respect to the child's chronological age. Using such comparisons with other sources of data, the WISC can contribute information concerning a child's developmental and psychological well-being. Very high or very low scores may suggest contributing factors for adjustment difficulties in social contexts that present problems in accepting such developmental diversity (or that cannot accommodate more than a certain level of high cognitive functioning).

A FSIQ score of 135 or above is accepted for admission to Intertel, a society for the intellectually gifted.

== Translations ==
WISC has been translated or adapted to many languages, and norms have been established for a number of countries, including Spanish, Portuguese (Brazil and Portugal), Arabic, Icelandic, Norwegian, Swedish, Finnish, Czech, Croatian, French (France and Canada), German (Germany, Austria and Switzerland), English (United States, Canada, United Kingdom, Australia), Welsh, Dutch, Japanese, Chinese (Hong Kong, Taiwan), Korean (South Korea), Greek, Romanian, Indonesian, Slovenian, Hebrew and Italian. Separate norms are established with each translation. (Norway uses the Swedish norms). India uses the Malin's Intelligence Scale for Indian Children (MISIC), an adaptation of WISC by Arthur J. Malin. However, the norms of MISIC are outdated (have not been updated since 50 years) and many Clinical Psychologists do not use this test in their practice due to possible errors in measured IQs because of Flynn effect. Being from a developing nation, Indian children have undergone numerous changes in their intellectual abilities over the past 5 decades, which makes the application of MISIC redundant, though some psychometricians suggest that such changes are minor, hence the test is still applicable. Instead of MISIC, the fourth edition of WISC that was adapted and standardized for India in 2012, is more commonly accepted and used by clinicians. Being the most widely used test for intelligence assessment in India, MISIC still has its supporters, and will continue to be used by clinicians all over the country, owing to which its norms must be updated. The Japanese version of the WISC-IV was developed by Japanese psychologists Kazuhiko Ueno, Kazuhiro Fujita, Hisao Maekawa, Toshinori Ishikuma, Hitoshi Dairoku, and Osamu Matsuda.

== See also ==
- Wechsler Adult Intelligence Scale
- Wechsler Preschool and Primary Scale of Intelligence

== Literature ==
- Cohen, M. (1997). Children's memory scale. San Antonio, TX: The Psychological Corporation.
- Flynn, J. R. (1984). The mean IQ of Americans: Massive gains 1932 to 1978. Psychological Bulletin, 95(1), 29–51.
- Flynn, J. R. (1987). Massive IQ gains in 14 nations: What IQ tests really measure. Psychological Bulletin, 101(2), 171–191.
- Flynn, J. R. (1999). Searching for justice: The discovery of IQ gains over time. American Psychologist, 54(1), 5–20.
- Harrison, P. L., & Oakland, T. (2003). Adaptive behaviour assessment system–second edition). San Antonio, TX: The Psychological Corporation.
- Kaplan, R.M. & Saccuzzo, D.P. (2005). Psychological Testing: Principles, applications, and issues. Belmont, CA: Thomson Wadsworth
- Kaufman, A. S., Raiford, S. E., & Coalson, D. L. (2016). Intelligent Testing with the WISC-V. Hoboken, NJ: Wiley.
- Matarazzo, J. D. (1972). Wechsler's measurement and appraisal of adult intelligence (5th ed.). Baltimore: Williams & Wilkins.
- Raiford, S. E., Zhang, O., Drozdick, L. W., Getz, K., Wahlstrom, D., Gabel, A., Holdnack, J. A., & Daniel, M. (2016). WISC-V Coding and Symbol Search in digital format: Reliability, validity, special group studies, and interpretation. Retrieved from http://images.pearsonclinical.com/images/Assets/WISC-V/Qi-Processing-Speed-Tech-Report.pdf
- Raiford, S. E., Drozdick, L. W., Zhang, O., & Xuechun, X. (2015). Expanded index scores (WISC-V technical report 1). Bloomington, MN: Pearson. Retrieved from http://downloads.pearsonclinical.com/images/Assets/WISC-V/WISC-VTechReport1_FNL_v3.pdf
- The Psychological Corporation. (2001). Wechsler individual achievement test—second edition. San Antonio, TX: Author.
- Ward, S.B., Ward, T. J., Hatt, C.V., Young, D.L, & Mollner, N.R. (1995). The incidence and utility of the ACID, ACIDS, and SCAD profiles in a referred population. Psychology in the Schools, 32(4), 267–276
- Watkins, M.W., Kush, J., & Glutting, J.J. (1997). Discriminant and predictive validity of the WISC-III ACID profile among children with learning disabilities. Psychology in the Schools, 34(4), 309–319
- Wechsler, D. (1939). Wechsler-Bellevue intelligence scale. New York: The Psychological Corporation.
- Wechsler, D. (1949). Wechsler intelligence scale for children. New York: The Psychological Corporation.
- Wechsler, D. (1974). Wechsler intelligence scale for children—revised. New York: Psychological Corporation.
- Wechsler, D. (1991). The Wechsler intelligence scale for children—third edition. San Antonio, TX: The Psychological Corporation.
- Wechsler, D. (2003). The Wechsler intelligence scale for children—fourth edition. London: Pearson.
- Wechsler, D. (2014). Wechsler intelligence scale for children-fifth edition. Bloomington, MN: Pearson.
