= Outline of human intelligence =

The following outline is provided as an overview of and topical guide to human intelligence:

Human intelligence is, in the human species, the mental capacities to learn, understand, and reason, including the capacities to comprehend ideas, plan, solve problems, and use language to communicate.

== Traits and aspects ==
=== In groups ===
- Collective intelligence
- Collective wisdom
- Common sense
- Human Intelligence

=== In individuals ===
- Abstract thought
- Creativity
- Emotional intelligence
- Fluid and crystallized intelligence
- Knowledge
- Learning
- Malleability of intelligence
- Memory
  - Working memory
- Moral intelligence
- Problem solving
- Reaction time
- Reasoning
- Risk intelligence
- Skill
- Social intelligence
  - Communication
- Spatial intelligence
- Spiritual intelligence
- Understanding
- Verbal intelligence
- Visual processing

== Augmented with technology ==
- Humanistic intelligence

== Capacities ==
Cognition and mental processing

- Association
- Attention
- Belief
- Concept formation
  - Conception
- Creativity
- Emotion
- Language
- Imagination
- Intellectual giftedness
- Introspection
- Memory
  - Metamemory
  - Pattern recognition
- Metacognition
- Mental imagery
- Perception
- Reasoning
  - Abductive reasoning
  - Deductive reasoning
  - Inductive reasoning
- Volition
  - Action
  - Problem solving

== Types of people, by intelligence ==
=== High ===
- Child prodigy
  - List of child prodigies
- Genius
- Polymath
- Intellectual

=== Low ===
- Intellectual disability

== Models and theories ==
- Cattell–Horn–Carroll theory
- Fluid and crystallized intelligence
- General factor of intelligence
- Theory of multiple intelligences
- Triarchic theory of intelligence
- PASS theory of intelligence
- Parieto-frontal integration theory
- Vernon's verbal-perceptual model
- g-VPR model

== Related factors ==
- Fertility and intelligence
- Impact of health on intelligence
- Environment and intelligence
- Height and intelligence
- Neurological factors upon intelligence
- Race and intelligence
- Nations and intelligence
- Sex differences in intelligence
- Religiosity and intelligence
- Intelligence and personality

== Fields that study human intelligence ==
- Cognitive epidemiology
- Evolution of human intelligence
- Heritability of IQ
- Mental chronometry
- Intelligence and public policy
- Behavioural genetics
- Human behavior genetics

=== Psychometrics: measurement ===
- Psychometrics
  - Flynn effect
  - Educational quotient
  - g factor
  - Heritability of IQ
  - Intelligence quotient
    - Ammons Quick Test
    - Army General Classification Test
    - Block design test
    - Bracken School Readiness Assessment
    - Cattell Culture Fair III
    - Cognitive Abilities Test
    - Differential Ability Scales
    - Figure Reasoning Test
    - Intelligence quotient
    - Jensen box
    - Kaufman Assessment Battery for Children
    - Knox Cubes
    - Kohs block design test
    - Leiter International Performance Scale
    - Lothian birth-cohort studies
    - Miller Analogies Test
    - NNAT
    - Otis–Lennon School Ability Test
    - Peabody Picture Vocabulary Test
    - Porteus Maze Test
    - Raven's Progressive Matrices
    - Reynolds Intellectual Assessment Scales
    - Stanford–Binet Intelligence Scales
    - Wechsler Adult Intelligence Scale
    - Wechsler Intelligence Scale for Children
    - Wechsler Preschool and Primary Scale of Intelligence
    - Wonderlic Test
    - Woodcock-Johnson Tests of Cognitive Abilities
  - Standardized testing

== History ==
- Evolution of human intelligence
- History of the race and intelligence controversy

== Organizations ==
- High IQ societies
  - Intertel
  - Mensa International
  - Triple Nine Society

== Publications ==
- Intelligence (journal)

== Scholars and researchers ==
- Anne Anastasi (1908–2001)
- Timothy Bates
- Camilla Benbow
- Ruth Benedict (1887–1948)
- Alfred Binet (1857–1911)
- Thomas J. Bouchard, Jr.
- Chris Brand
- Carl Brigham (1890–1943)
- Nathan Brody
- Cyril Burt
- John Bissell Carroll
- James McKeen Cattell
- Raymond Cattell
- Stephen J. Ceci
- Catharine Cox Miles
- Ian Deary
- Andreas Demetriou
- Douglas K. Detterman
- Hans Eysenck (1916–1997)
- Jefferson Fish
- James R. Flynn
- Francis Galton (1822–1911)
- Howard Gardner
- Henry H. Goddard (1866–1957)
- Robert A. Gordon
- Linda Gottfredson
- John Curtis Gowan
- Anthony Gregorc
- J. P. Guilford
- Richard J. Haier
- Richard Herrnstein
- Ronald K. Hoeflin
- Leta Stetter Hollingworth
- Lloyd Humphreys
- Earl B. Hunt
- Seymour Itzkoff
- Douglas N. Jackson
- Arthur Jensen (1923–2012)
- Leon Kamin
- Alan S. Kaufman
- James C. Kaufman
- Nadeen L. Kaufman
- Scott Barry Kaufman
- Timothy Z. Keith
- John C. Loehlin
- David Lubinski
- Richard Lynn
- Nicholas Mackintosh
- Jonathan M. Marks
- Frank C. J. McGurk (1910–1995)
- Ulric Neisser
- Helmuth Nyborg
- R. Travis Osborne
- John C. Raven
- Cecil R. Reynolds
- J. Philippe Rushton (1943–2012)
- Sandra Scarr
- Théodore Simon
- Charles Spearman
- Herman H. Spitz
- William Stern
- Robert Sternberg
- Lewis Terman (1877–1956)
- Lee A. Thompson
- Louis Leon Thurstone
- Ellis Paul Torrance
- Ledyard Tucker
- Philip A. Vernon
- David Wechsler
- Volkmar Weiss
- Lee Willerman
- Robert Yerkes (1876–1956)

== See also ==
- Active intellect
- Cognition
- Cognitivism
- Downing effect
- Educational psychology
- Fertility and intelligence
- Individual differences psychology
- Intellectual giftedness
- Knowledge
- Mental event
- Mental operations
- Neurocognitive
- Passive intellect
- Sex and psychology
