= Health and intelligence =

Health and intelligence may refer to:

- Impact of health on intelligence, research findings on how health deficiencies and medical and nutritional interventions influence intelligence test scores
- Cognitive epidemiology, a field of research investigating how intelligence measured at an early age predicts later morbidity and mortality outcomes
