= Otis–Lennon School Ability Test =

Standardized test

The Otis–Lennon School Ability Test (OLSAT), published by the successor of Harcourt Assessment—Pearson Education, Inc., a subsidiary of Pearson PLC—is according to the publisher, a test of abstract thinking and reasoning ability of children pre-K to 18. The Otis-Lennon is group-administered (except preschool), multiple choice, taken with pencil and paper, measures verbal, quantitative, and spatial reasoning ability. The test yields verbal and nonverbal scores, from which a total score is derived, called a School Ability Index (SAI). The SAI is a normalized standard score with a mean of 100 and a standard deviation of 16. With the exception of pre-K, the test is administered in groups.

== Test components ==
The test has twenty-one subtests that are organized into five areas—verbal comprehension, verbal reasoning, pictorial reasoning, figural reasoning, and quantitative reasoning—each with equal numbers of verbal and non-verbal items:

Verbal	Nonverbal
Verbal Comprehension	Pictorial Reasoning
Following Directions	Picture Classification
Antonyms	Picture Analogies
Sentence Completion	Picture Series
Sentence Arrangement	Figural Reasoning
Verbal Reasoning	Figural Classification
Aural Reasoning	Figural Analogies
Arithmetic Reasoning	Pattern Matrix
Logical Selection	Figural Series
Word/Letter Matrix	Quantitative Reasoning
Verbal Analogies	Number Series
Verbal Classification	Numeric Inference
Inference	Number Matrix

The number of questions and the time limit varies accordingly:

Level	Verbal	Nonverbal	Total	Time Limit
A (Pre-K)	16	24	40	77 min.
A (K)	30	30	60	77 min.
B	30	30	60	77 min.
C	30	30	60	72 min.
D	32	32	64	50 min.
E	36	36	72	40 min.
F	36	36	72	60 min.
G	36	36	72	60 min.

== Uses in primary and secondary education ==
In 2012, the New York City Department of Education (NYC DOE) adjusted its criteria for inferring gifted and talented needs of students in kindergarten through the third grade. Citing a disproportionate number of students scoring in the 99th percentile — the far right tail of the distribution curve — the NYC DOE replaced the Bracken (BSRA) with the Naglieri Nonverbal Ability Test (NNAT), and changed the weighting, lowering the OLSAT from two-thirds to one-third and giving the NNAT two-thirds.

A local news source reported that many parents were unhappy about the decrease in the weighting of the OLSAT and the implementation of the NNAT. The objective, according to the NYC DOE, was to combat the advantages of children receiving pretest tutoring. The NYC DOE avers that the OLSAT is more preppable and the NNAT is less preppable.

== Uses by high-IQ societies ==
High scores on the OLSAT are accepted by high IQ societies such as American Mensa (requiring a total SAI ≥ 132) and Intertel (requiring a total SAI ≥ 138), the latter also accepting scores on this test's historical predecessor, the OLMAT.

== Criticisms ==
Accuracy

The fact that the OLSAT is easier and less expensive to administer than an IQ test, such as the Stanford Binet V or the Wechsler Intelligence Scale for Children, makes it more accessible; but its accuracy at higher levels is less reliable. High scores on the OLSAT are nevertheless accepted as qualifying evidence by high IQ societies such as Mensa and Intertel.

Test environment

Preschoolers taking the OLSAT for gifted and talented (G&T) kindergarten programs are more likely to be aware that they are taking a test. For that particular age, the test is given one-on-one. The test is presented in a multiple choice format, and either the child fills in the "bubble" or the tester does it for them. By contrast, many psychological, intelligence, and school ability tests (or assessments) are administered by psychologists who discreetly take notes while conducting introspective thinking activities. Under these conditions, the child is often unaware of being evaluated.

Test format for preschoolers

Some testing scholars have published concerns over whether the multiple-choice aspect of testing encourages guesswork over independent thinking.

Preparing for the test

For the 2007–08 school-year, New York City began using the OLSAT to infer gifted pedagogical needs of public school children entering kindergarten through 3rd grade. Preschools – and a cottage industry of test preparation companies – soon thereafter began offering OLSAT test-preparation. OLSAT attempts to infer "school ability" for a particular grade. In New York City, a preschooler being screened for a gifted pedagogy at the kindergarten level would simply be assessed using the OLSAT that measures kindergarten scholastic ability. OLSAT test preparation programs for preschoolers have essentially incorporated an OLSAT oriented kindergarten curriculum.

== Editions ==
1st ed. — Otis-Lennon School Ability Test (published August 13, 1979)
2nd ed. — Otis-Lennon School Ability Test (published September 10, 1982)
6th ed. — Otis-Lennon School Ability Test (published November 15, 1988)
7th ed. — Otis-Lennon School Ability Test (published October 23, 1995)
8th ed. — Otis-Lennon School Ability Test
