= Verbal intelligence =

Ability to understand concepts in words

English alphabet. Letters form the basis for many languages, including English

Verbal intelligence is the ability to understand and reason using concepts framed in words. More broadly, it is linked to problem solving, abstract reasoning, and working memory. Verbal intelligence is one of the most g-loaded abilities.

== Linguistic intelligence ==
In order to understand linguistic intelligence, it is important to understand the mechanisms that control speech and language. These mechanisms can be broken down into four major groups: speech generation (talking), speech comprehension (hearing), writing generation (writing), and writing comprehension (reading).

In a practical sense, linguistic intelligence is the extent to which an individual can use language, both written and verbal, to achieve goals.

Linguistic intelligence is a part of Howard Gardner's multiple intelligence theory that deals with individuals' ability to understand both spoken and written language, as well as their ability to speak and write themselves.

=== Spoken language ===
==== Generation ====
Inferior frontal gyrus; a major part of the inferior frontal cortex

Speech production is the process by which a thought in the brain is converted into an understandable auditory form. This is a multistage mechanism that involves many different areas of the brain. The first stage is planning, where the brain constructs words and sentences that turn the thought into an understandable form. This occurs primarily in the inferior frontal cortex, specifically in an area known as Broca's area. Next, the brain must plan how to physically create the sounds necessary for speech by linking the planned speech with known sounds, or phonemes. While the location of these associations is not known, it is known that the supplementary motor area plays a key role in this step. Finally, the brain must signal for the words to actually be spoken. This is carried out by the premotor cortex and the motor cortex.

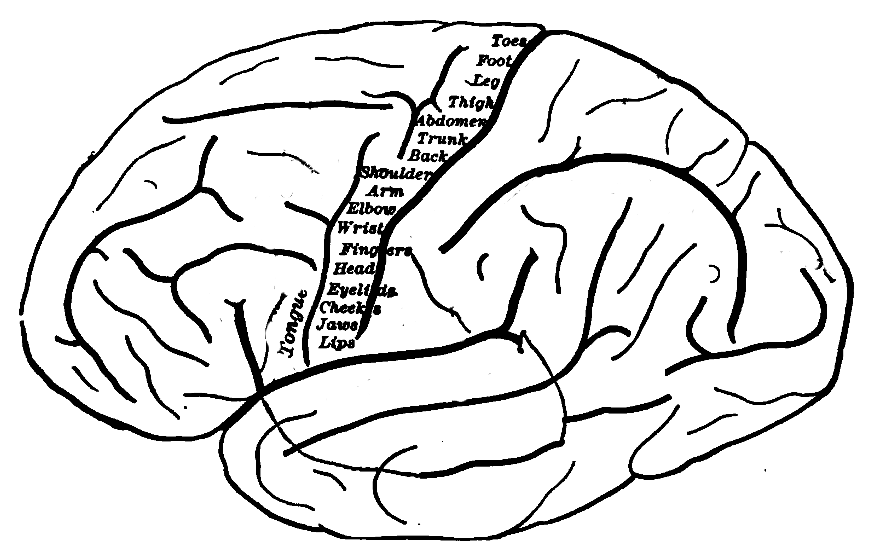
Motor cortex with muscle localization shown

In most cases, speech production is controlled by the left hemisphere. In a series of studies, Wilder Penfield, among others, probed the brains of both right-handed (generally left-hemisphere dominant) and left-handed (generally right-hemisphere dominant) patients. They discovered that, regardless of handedness, the left hemisphere was almost always the speech controlling side. However, it has been discovered that in cases of neural stress (hemorrhage, stroke, etc.) the right hemisphere has the ability to take control of speech functions.

=== Comprehension ===
Verbal Comprehension is a fairly complex process, and it is not fully understood. From various studies and experiments, it has been found that the superior temporal sulcus activates when hearing human speech, and that speech processing seems to occur within Wernicke's area.

==== Auditory feedback and feedforward ====
Hearing plays an important part in both speech generation and comprehension. When speaking, the person can hear their speech, and the brain uses what it hears as a feedback mechanism to fix speech errors. If a single feedback correction occurs multiple times, the brain will begin to incorporate the correction to all future speech, making it a feed forward mechanism. This is apparent in some deaf people. Deafness, as well as other, smaller deficiencies in hearing, can greatly affect one's ability to comprehend spoken language, as well as to speak it. However, if the person loses hearing ability later in life, most can still maintain a normal level of verbal intelligence. This is thought to be because of the brain's feed forward mechanism still helping to fix speech errors, even in the absence of auditory feedback.

=== Written language ===
==== Generation ====
Generation of written language is thought to be closely related to speech generation. Neurophysiologically speaking, it is believed that Broca's area is crucial for early linguistic processing, while the inferior frontal gyrus is critical in semantic processing. According to Penfield, writing differs in two major ways from verbal language. First, instead of relating the thought to sounds, the brain must relate the thought to symbols or letters, and second, the motor cortex activates a different set of muscles to write, than when speaking.

==== Comprehension ====
Written comprehension, similar to spoken comprehension, seems to occur primarily in Wernicke's area. However, instead of using the auditory system to gain language input, written comprehension relies on the visual system.

== Genetic links ==
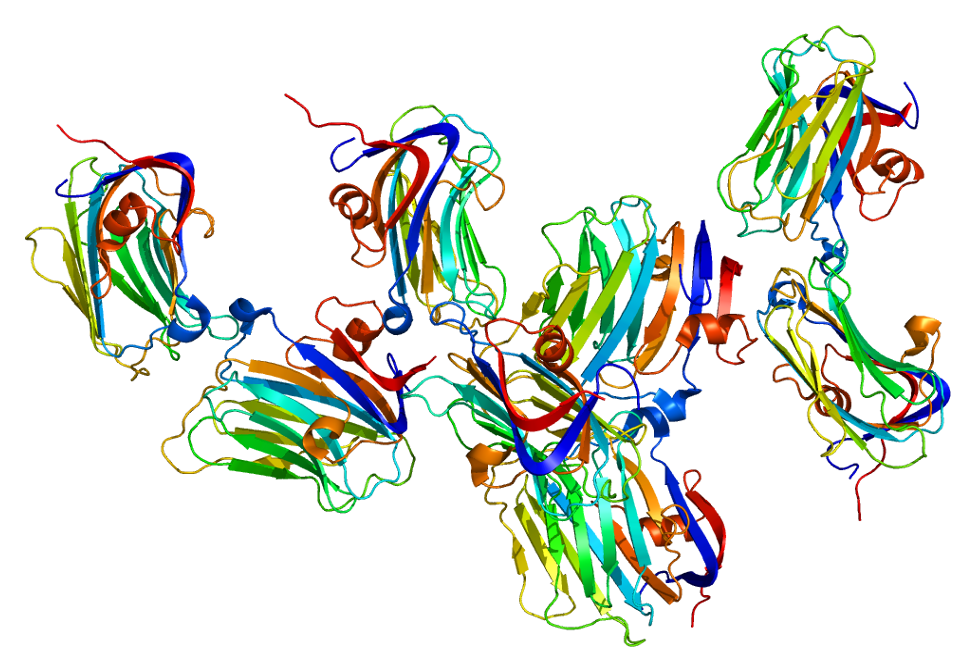
Protein NRXN1, which is created from the NRXN1 gene

While the capabilities of the physical structures used are large factors in determining linguistic intelligence, there have been several genes that have been linked to individual linguistic ability. The NRXN1 gene has been linked to general language ability, and mutations of this gene has been shown to cause major issues to overall linguistic intelligence. The CNTNAP2 gene is believed to affect language development and performance, and mutations in this gene is thought to be involved in autism spectrum disorders. PCDH11 has been linked to language capacity, and it is believed to be one of the factors that accounts for the variation in linguistic intelligence.

== Measurement and testing ==
The Wechsler Adult Intelligence Scale III (WAIS-III) divides Verbal IQ (VIQ) into two categories:

- Verbal Comprehension Index (VCI) – vocabulary, similarities, information, and comprehension.
- Working Memory Index (WMI) – arithmetic, digit span, and letter-number sequencing.

=== Verbal fluency tests ===
In general, it is difficult to test for linguistic intelligence as a whole, therefore various types of verbal fluency tests are often used.

- Semantic Fluency Test – Subjects are asked to produce words in groups, such as animals, kitchen tools, fruits, etc. This type of test focuses on the subject's ability to generate words that have meaning to them. This test has been found to be sensitive to age.
- Formal Fluency Test – Subjects are asked to produce words given specific letter-based rules. This test has been found to be sensitive to education level.
  - Initial Letter Fluency Test – A type of formal fluency test where the subject is asked to list words starting with a specific letter.
  - Excluded Letter Fluency Test – A type of formal fluency test where the subject is asked to list words that do not contain a certain letter.
- Verb Fluency Test – Subjects are asked to list verbs. Subjects are then tested on their ability to use listed verbs.
- Verbal Reproduction Test – Subjects are asked to listen to a monologue. They are then asked to repeat the monologue, and the subject is scored based on the number of words and lemmas used from the original monologue.

=== Verbal fluency in children ===
In one series of tests, it was shown that when children were given verbal fluency tests, a larger portion of their cortex activated compared to adults, as well as activation of both the left and right hemispheres. This is most likely due to the high plasticity of newly developing brains.

=== Possible conflict ===
Recently, a study was done showing that verbal fluency test results can differ depending on the mental focus of the subject. In this study, mental focus on physical speech production mechanisms caused speech production times to suffer, whereas mental focus on auditory feedback improved these times.

== Disorders affecting linguistic intelligence ==
Since linguistic intelligence is based on several complex skills, there are many disorders and injuries that can affect an individual's linguistic intelligence.

=== Injuries ===
Damage and injury in the brain can severely lower one's ability to communicate, and therefore lower one's linguistic intelligence. Common forms of major damage are strokes, concussions, brain tumors, viral/bacterial damage, and drug-related damage. The three major linguistic disorders that result from these injuries are aphasia, alexia, and agraphia. Aphasia is the inability to speak, and can be caused by damage to Broca's area or the motor cortex. Alexia is the inability to read, which can arise from damage to Wernicke's area, among other places. Agraphia is the inability to write which can also arise from damage to Broca's area or the motor cortex. In addition, damage to large areas of the brain can result in any combinations of these disorders, as well as a loss of other abilities.

=== Pure language disorders ===
There are several disorders that primarily affect only language skills. Three major pure language disorders are Developmental verbal dyspraxia, specific language impairment, and stuttering. Developmental verbal dyspraxia (DVD) is a disorder where children have errors in consonant and vowel production. Specific language impairment (SLI) is a disorder where the patient has a lack of language acquisition skills, despite a seemingly normal intelligence level in other areas. Stuttering is a fairly common disorder where speech flow is interrupted by involuntary repetitions of syllables.

=== Other disorders affecting language ===
Some disorders cause a wide array of effects, and language impairment is merely one of many possible symptoms. The two major disorders of this type are autism spectrum disorder and epilepsy. Autism spectrum disorder (ASD) is a disorder in which the patient suffers from decreased social skills and lowered mental flexibility. As a result, many patients suffering from ASD also have language problems, arising from both the lack of social interaction and lowered mental flexibility. Epilepsy is a disorder where electrical malfunctions or mis-communications in the brain cause seizures, leading to muscle spasms and activation of other organs and systems of the body. Over time, epilepsy can lead to cognitive and behavioral decay. This mental decay can eventually lead to a loss of language and communication skills. Some authors discuss the relationships that exist between expressive language and auditory reception, and therefore language disorders and auditory processing disorders.

== See also ==
- Outline of human intelligence
- Language
- Language acquisition
- Sentence processing
- Auditory processing disorder
- Speech-language pathology
- Theory of multiple intelligences
- Verbal fluency test
- Speech
- Reading education
- Verbal IQ in WAIS-III

== Sources ==
- Doidge, Norman (2007). The Brain That Changes Itself: Stories of Personal Triumph from the Frontiers of Brain Science. Penguin. ISBN 978-1-101-14711-5.
- Penfield, Wilder; Roberts, Lamar (1981). Speech and Brain Mechanisms. doi:10.1515/9781400854677. ISBN 978-1-4008-5467-7.
