= Kohs =

Kohs may refer to:

== People ==
- Ellis B. Kohs (1916–2000), American composer
- Greg Kohs (director), director of AlphaGo
- Gregory Kohs, founder of MyWikiBiz
- Samuel Calmin Kohs (1890–1984), American psychologist
- Verners Kohs (born 1997), Latvian basketball player

== Other ==
- KOHS (radio station), 91.7 FM at Orem High School in Orem, Utah
- Keystone Oaks High School, in suburban Pittsburgh, Pennsylvania
