= Catharine Gale =

British epidemiologist

- Born: Catharine Rose Gale
- Education: University of Southampton
- Known for: Cognitive epidemiology
- Scientific career
- Fields: Epidemiology
- Institutions: University of Edinburgh; University of Southampton
- Thesis: Antioxidant vitamins, cerebrovascular disease and cognitive function in elderly people (1998)

Catharine Rose Gale is a British epidemiologist. She is Professor of Cognitive Epidemiology in the Faculty of Medicine at the University of Southampton. She is also Reader in Cognitive Epidemiology in the Department of Psychology and co-leader of the Cognitive Epidemiology research group in the Centre for Cognitive Ageing and Cognitive Epidemiology at the University of Edinburgh. She received her PhD from the University of Southampton's MRC Environmental Epidemiology Unit.
