= BSRA =

BSRA may refer to:

- Bracken School Readiness Assessment, an individual cognitive test designed for children
- British Society for Research on Ageing, a scientific society
- Boston Street Railway Association, a non-profit organization in Boston, Massachusetts dedicated to transportation history

== Sports ==
- Barbados Squash Rackets Association, see sport in Barbados
- Botswana Squash Rackets Association
- Brisbane Schoolgirls' Rowing Association, see Head of the River
