= Thurstone Word Fluency Test =

Verbal fluency test

- Synonyms: Chicago Word Fluency Test
- Purpose: measure an individual's symbolic verbal fluency

The Thurstone Word Fluency Test, also known as the Chicago Word Fluency Test (CWFT), was developed by Louis Thurstone in 1938. This test became the first word fluency psychometrically measured test available to patients with brain damage. The test is a used to measure an individual's symbolic verbal fluency. The test asks the subject to write as many words as possible beginning with the letter 'S' within a 5-minute limit, then as many words as possible beginning with letter 'C' within 4 minute limit. The total number of 'S' and 'C' words produced, minus the number of rule-breaking and perseverative responses, yield the patients' measure of verbal fluency.

The CWFT is used as one of the measures of brain's frontal lobe function. A related test, the COWAT (Controlled oral word association test), is part of the Halstead-Reitan Neuropsychological Battery.

== See also ==
- Verbal fluency test
