= Outline of intelligence =

Outline of intelligence may refer to:

- Outline of human intelligence
- Outline of artificial intelligence
