= Height and intelligence =

The study of height and intelligence examines correlations between human height and human intelligence. Some epidemiological research on the subject has shown that there is a small but statistically significant positive correlation between height and intelligence after controlling for socioeconomic class and parental education. One such theory argues that since height strongly correlates with white and gray matter volume, it may act as a biomarker for cerebral development which itself mediates intelligence.

Competing explanations for the correlation between height and intelligence include that certain genetic factors may influence both height and intelligence, or that both height and intelligence may be affected in similar ways by adverse environmental exposures during development. Measurements of the total surface area and mean thickness of the cortical grey matter using a magnetic resonance imaging (MRI) revealed that the height of individuals had a positive correlation with the total cortical surface area. This supports the idea that genes that influence height also influence total surface area of the brain, which in turn influences intelligence, resulting in the correlation. Other explanations further qualify the positive correlation between height and intelligence, suggesting that because the correlation becomes weaker with higher socioeconomic class and education level, environmental factors could partially override any genetic factors affecting both characteristics.

== Previous studies ==
First inquiries into the correlation of height and intelligence came within the study of development in schoolchildren. William Porter was the first person to conduct a study to find a relationship between the physiology of children and their intelligence. The motive for this research was to attempt to predict the potential "dullness" or "precocity" of children based on simple measurements teachers could make. He did in fact find a correlation between body size and the learning level of children, but did not focus specifically on height.

More recent studies have continued the research into a correlation between height and intelligence, but again were often not directly related to height and intelligence. Some of the earlier large studies cited for height and intelligence are the Scottish Mental Surveys in 1932 and 1947. However, the studies were largely meant to analyze the genetic and environmental contributions to cognitive ability differences. Height (and weight) were added to provide a multivariate analysis.

In an effort to better understand this association, numerous other studies were thus carried out. These studies either expanded upon the association or sought to find an explanation.

A study by Douglas, et al. (1965) addressed the Scottish study and sought to test if the association reflected a linkage between development of the brain and/or emotional development and the development of the rest of the body. Similarly, in 1986, Wilson et al. wanted to study if there is a longitudinal relation between height and intelligence.

Nonetheless, as these studies were unable to provide satisfying results and explanations for the correlation, interest in it persists in the 21st century.

In 2014, another study was carried out by a team of researchers at Edinburgh University, Scotland, motivated by the understanding that both height and intelligence test scores are predictors of better health outcomes and mortality. The study was constructed to better identify if there are any shared phenotypic and genetic influences from height and intelligence in determining health outcomes and mortality.(Be aware of the difference between genetic correlation and phenotypic correlation since the former means the proportion of heritability that two traits share while the latter just means the term that describes animals with high values for one phenotype also tending to have high (or low) values for another phenotype so to discuss over the correlation between measured height and intelligence, phenotypic correlation is what should be discussed.)

== Definition of intelligence ==
Human intelligence can be measured according to an extensive number of tests and criteria, ranging from academic, social, and emotional fields. While there is no clear consensus on a definition of human intelligence, there are common themes among those that exist, summarized generally as "Intelligence measures an agent's ability to achieve goals in a wide range of environments". There are several theories that define different categories of intelligence and associate traits, instead of a single general ability. In most of the studies, intelligence quotient (IQ) tests were used to measure a subject's mental age, which was checked for possible correlation with height. While the use of IQ tests are highly debated among scientists as an accurate measurement of intelligence, they provide a quantitative and normal distribution to compare cognitive abilities among people.

Intelligence cannot be strictly defined, and it has been cautioned that intelligence has many different facets. Regardless, studies conducted to compare height with intelligence frequently use the Wechsler Adult Intelligence Scale (WAIS) which measures verbal and performance abilities for individuals over the age of 16 (WISC for those under 16) years through the following tests: information, general comprehension, memory span, arithmetical reasoning, similarities, vocabulary, picture arrangement, picture completion, block design, object assembly, and a digit symbol test. Many of the studies performed on the relationship between physical stature and intelligence used one of these tests in order to gauge relative cognitive ability based on the age of the participants. In addition to IQ tests, some of the studies that were performed on children use academic performance as a measure of intelligence through standardized tests such as the Wide Range Achievement Test.

== Correlation: studies and methodologies ==
A 1986 study of 13,887 American youths aged 6 to 17 years old sought to examine the correlation between height and intelligence. Height was normalized for age and sex, and intelligence was measured with the Wechsler Intelligence Scale for Children and the Wide Range Achievement Test, measuring intellectual development (IQ) and academic achievement, respectively. Subjects were re-examined 2 to 5 years later. Both the Wechsler Intelligence Scale for Children and the Wide Range Achievement Test were found to significantly correlate with height. However, change in height was found not to be correlated with IQ score.

In 2000 another study found a similar correlation. 127 growth-restricted and 32 non-growth-restricted children aged 9 to 24 months were put on a two-year "randomized trial of nutritional supplementation and psychosocial stimulation." Eight years later, the subjects' growth, IQ, and cognitive functions were measured. IQ was also measured using the Wechsler Intelligence Scales. As in the 1986 study, it was found that supplementation to growth was not correlated with cognitive ability. Only psychosocial stimulation was found to increase IQ scores of subjects, and growth-restricted children had lower IQ scores than non-growth-restricted children, lending more evidence to the long-term cognitive consequences of growth restriction.

These studies confirmed results found by JM Tanner in 1966. This study found that among children of school age, there is a correlation of about 0.15-0.25 between height and score on the 11+ test, an examination administered to students in England. It was found that this correlation decreases with age, but does not completely disappear; in samples of young adults, correlations of up to 0.2 were found. This study also found that "the greater the number of children in the family the lower their height and the less their scores in mental tests", and attributes the effect "to co-advancement [of height and cognitive ability] and disappears when maturity is reached." The correlation between number of children and intelligence was found to be stronger in poor families than in rich ones, which contributed to the conclusion that there is a strong correlation between height and mental ability between children in different socio-economic groups that persists in adulthood.

A study was done by the Newcastle Thousands Families in 1947 to see if there was a correlation between birth weights and IQ at ages 9 and 13. There showed no correlation between birth weights and their IQs. However, height at the age of 9 played a major role in the IQ of the children (standardized regression coefficient b = 2.6, 95% CI 1.6-3.6, P < 0.0001). At the ages of 13, social economics played yet another larger role (b = 3.4, 95% CI 2.3-4.4, P = 0.001).

With data from ten consecutive years of quantitative measurements on height and intelligence separated by girls and boys and gathered from the Harvard Growth Study, this compilation of analyses shows the difference in correlation between height and intelligence in the classes of girls and boys. Boys demonstrate no clear correlation between height at a certain age group and intelligence later on in life but girls do. There appears to be a clear link between intelligence levels at 10 and 11 with a girl's height at the ages of 8 and 9 with other variables of note, i.e., socioeconomic status, age of first menstruation and ethnicity factoring into the correlation as well.

A 1999 study that was conducted on a sample on 32,887 Swedish men, aged 18, free of growth defects showed that, by and large, shorter men (with 2 standard deviations below the mean) demonstrated poorer physical and psychological performance in the context of military service, with increased risk of musculoskeletal diagnoses. Additionally, increased height showed a relationship with increased mean intellectual performance and, under conditions of stress, shorter men showcased demonstrably worse leadership capability and psychological function.

A 2011 model which incorporated assortative mating patterns into a bivariate model was used to account for height-to-intelligence factors that related to these mating habits as well as pleiotropic genetic influences when establishing the correlation between height and intelligence. Additionally, this team of researchers was responsible for using a dataset aggregated for Swedish male twins to explain both the genetic and environmental influences of the relationship between height and intelligence and height and capability to manage wartime stress.

In 1989 the heights of male and female corporate managers and non-managers were measured in two studies with about 200 subjects. Both studies found a statistically significant correlation between managerial position and height; taller people were more likely to hold managerial positions, regardless of sex.

A 2005 study used data on 1,181 identical twins and 1,412 fraternal twins, collected from Norwegian army files and Norwegian twin registries, in order to factor the correlation between intelligence test scores and standing height into environmental and genetic components. It used a structural equation model comparing the correlation between genetic, shared environmental and non-shared environmental factors and found that 59% of the height-intelligence correlation was due to shared environmental factors. Genes were found to contribute 35% of the correlation, and non-shared environmental factors contributed 6%, both statistically significant amounts.

A 1991 study conducted on 76,111 Danish men sought to test the height-intelligence positive correlation on either extremes of height. The study defined two groups: the short group, composed of individuals below the 2nd percentile for height and the tall group, composed of individuals above the 98th percentile for height in Denmark. It found that the short group's intelligence test score and educational level means lay about two-thirds of a standard deviation below the overall means, but suggested there appeared to be local factors that may have contributed negatively and significantly to the scores. In contrast, the study found the tall group scored about one-half standard deviation above the overall means, but suggested that both groups scored below what would be expected from a linear trend.

A study from 1985 to 2005 was conducted on Dutch twin pairs from the ages 5 to 18 to establish a correlation factor. There was shown a positive correlation in childhood and early adolescence. These factors were used to gauge the intelligence in adults. The contributing factors for this study were mainly just genetics and full-scaled IQ.

There was weak or no correlation between cognitive ability and height found when examining ten brain measurements from a large elderly population, even when controlled for sex and age. Even though height and brain size are highly influenced by genes, doubt is raised about the relationship between them when considering that the correlation between height and cognitive ability is not steady throughout life. There is an increase in brain development during the adolescent years and a marked decrease afterwards, despite height generally staying constant after reaching adulthood.

== Explanations of the correlation ==
An individual's height is determined by a complex interplay between genes and environment. Statistical analysis of multiple research studies have produced a correlation between height and intelligence. Various genetic and environmental factors may influence height, and the reasons are sought for any correlation with measured intelligence.

It has been suggested that increases in average height, in response to improved nutrition, have been accompanied by an increase in brain size, and is one explanation for an overall rise in measured intelligence among all tested populations that has been called the Flynn effect.

Heritability estimates for height can be generated using comparisons among close relatives, such as between parents and children or siblings. To measure the effect of genetic inheritance, height comparisons are correlated with total shared genetic markers. Common percent values range between 60 and 80%, with high variation attributed to differences in a population's genetic history and environment (such as climate, nutrition, and lifestyle).

The most notable contributing environmental influences associated with the correlation of height and IQ include "diet, disease, psychosocial stress and inadequate cognitive stimulation" Populations that live under stable conditions tend to have higher values of genetic influence, while populations susceptible to events of poor nutrition and illness show greater determination from their environment.

It has been argued that an auxological approach with a focus on prenatal and very early child development, has been most effective in understanding if the correlation persists, especially within developing countries prone to environmental uncertainties.

Height and intelligence may be correlated, but there is not significant proof of it being caused by genetics. There are many genes associated with genetic transmission of intelligence, but current theories of intelligence point to inheritance of intelligence from parents to be due to both genetic and environmental factors, especially as there is no concrete proof of the relationship between certain genes and intelligence.

There is evidence that intellectual development is influenced by the expectations placed on an individual. In an experiment involving elementary school children, researchers found that when teachers believe students are above average intellect, these students tend to do better in school and receive higher IQ scores than students who are perceived as average or below average intellect, regardless of the actual competence of the students. This self-fulfilling prophecy caused by expectations is known as the Pygmalion effect, and it may play have an effect on taller student who are generally viewed as more mature or dominant.

Sexual selection and cross-trait assortative mating might also contribute to the correlation between height and intelligence. Because both height and intelligence positively affect an individual's overall fitness, individuals generally look for these traits in potential partners. In other words, smart men are more likely to mate with tall women, and smart women are more likely to mate with tall men, as both traits are affected by perceptions of cross-trait attractiveness.

== Statistics ==
Across studies, the correlation coefficient of height and intelligence was generally found to be around 0.2, indicating a positive association between height and intelligence which is weak but still statistically significant. A smaller within-family height-intelligence correlation of 0.10 was also found, indicating that both assortative mating and pleiotropy may be contributing causes for the general correlation.

Height and intelligence are both polygenic traits, and as a result it is difficult to isolate possible causes for the variation in each of these traits individually, let alone causes for correlations between them. Results regarding the relative responsibility of genetic and environmental factors in causing the correlation are far from conclusive; while some studies have arrived at similar estimates of the relative responsibility of genetic vs. environmental factors, others have arrived at completely different estimates.

It's also important to note that several of the recent studies confirming the correlation employed the standard bivariate ACE model, which is extremely sensitive to assumptions reflected in parameters. For instance, two of these studies arrived at similar estimates for the relative responsibility of common environmental and genetic factors in causing the correlation: 59% and 59% for the former, 31% and 35% for the latter. However, only slight modifications to the coefficient of assortative mating made the difference between the inferred percentage of genetic responsibility being as low as around 30% (the value the authors reported) to as high as 90%. Further, another study using the same model even concluded that genetics alone could explain the correlation, without any influence from common environmental factors such as one's education level and nutrition. This could have been because the studied population was relatively economically egalitarian, meaning access to resources like education and nutrition played less of a role than they might in other populations, or because of differences in how the researches handled the model and its parameters. The ACE model used in these studies was found to be sensitive to assumptions of assortative mating; results should therefore be interpreted with caution, as should the resulting percentages of genetic vs. environmental contribution.

== See also ==
- Height discrimination
- Human height
- Human variability
- Outline of human intelligence
