= PASS theory of intelligence =

Psychological theories

The Planning, Attention-Arousal, Simultaneous and Successive (P.A.S.S.) theory of intelligence, first proposed in 1975 by Das, Kirby and Jarman (1975), and later elaborated by Das, Naglieri & Kirby (1994) and Das, Kar & Parrilla (1996), challenges g-theory, on the grounds that the brain is made up of interdependent but separate functional systems. Neuroimaging studies and clinical studies of individuals with brain lesions make it clear that the brain is modularized; for example, damage to a particular area of the left temporal lobe will impair spoken and written language's production (but not comprehension). Damage to an adjacent area will have the opposite impact, preserving the individual's ability to produce but not understand speech and text.

The P.A.S.S. (Planning, Attention, Simultaneous and Successive cognitive processing) theory of intelligence identifies three operational units that are important to understand mental functioning: attention, simultaneous and successive processing, and planning. The PASS theory of intelligence is based on the psychological work of A. R. Luria. The P.A.S.S. model is an alternative approach to measuring and studying intelligence.

== Description ==
The PASS Theory of Intelligence posits that cognition is organized in three systems and four processes, based on Luria's (1966) work on modularization of brain activity and validated by decades of neuroimaging data. The first phase is planning, which entails executive functions directing and organizing behavior, selecting and developing strategies, and monitoring performance. The second is the Attention process, responsible for sustaining arousal and alertness and focusing on relevant inputs. Simultaneous and Successive Processing are procedures that encode, transform, and retain data. Simultaneous processing determines the relationship between objects, and integration into entire information units is necessary. Examples include recognizing figures, such as a triangle within a circle vs. a circle within a triangle. Successive processing is required for organizing separate items in a sequence, such as remembering a sequence of words or actions precisely in the order in which they had just been presented. These four processes are hypothesized to function in four areas of the brain. Planning is broadly located in the front part of our brains, the frontal lobe. Attention and arousal are combined functions of the frontal lobe and the lower parts of the cortex, although the parietal lobes are also involved in attention. Simultaneous processing and Successive processing occur in the posterior region or the back of the brain. Concurrent processing is broadly associated with the occipital and the parietal lobes, while Successive processing is broadly associated with the frontal-temporal lobes.The PASS (Planning/Attention/Simultaneous/Successive) theory is heavily indebted to both Luria (1966, 1973), and studies in cognitive psychology involved in promoting a different look at intelligence.

== Assessment of PASS processes ==

The PASS theory provides the theoretical framework for a measurement instrument called the Das-Naglieri Cognitive Assessment System (CAS), published in 1997. This test, now in a Second Edition (CAS2; 2014, Naglieri, Das & Gold-stein) is designed to provide an assessment of intellectual functioning redefined as four brain-based cognitive processes (Planning, Attention, Simultaneous and Successive), providing information about cognitive strengths and weaknesses of each of the four processes. This emphasis on processes (rather than traditional abilities) is said to make it useful for differential diagnosis; diagnosing learning disabilities and Attention Deficit Disorder, Autism, Intellectual disabilities, cognitive changes in aging and Down syndrome, changes due to brain impairment in stroke and fair and equitable assessment of diverse populations. Its usefulness as a theory and measurement instrument for Planning and Decision making in management has also been demonstrated.

== Links to general intelligence ==
Contemporary theories about intelligence can be divided into two classes: psychometric and cognitive. The quantitative approach to intelligence is better reflected in psychometric theories of which Charles Spearman's is an early example. In contrast, cognitive theories such as PASS theory are both qualitative and quantitative. Such theories advance the idea that intelligence has multiple cognitive processes. For example, both Robert Sternberg and Howard Gardner view intelligence as neither a single nor a biologically determined factor, but as a number of domains that represent the interaction of the individual's biological predispositions with the environment and cultural context. The PASS theory builds upon these principles. In a study by Keith et al. (2001), the g-factor derived via factor-analysis from the Woodcock–Johnson III, a standard IQ-test, correlated almost perfectly (r = 0.98) with the g-factor derived from the CAS.

== Links to brain activity ==
The core idea that cognitive functions can be organized in terms of broad functions of the brain received some support in a recent study (Okuhata et al.) that investigated the psychophysiology basis of two different types of information processing (simultaneous and successive). The authors investigated EEG coherence patterns during six tasks of the Das-Naglieri Cognitive Assessment System. They analyzed beta (12.5 – 25. Hz) coherence while 18 volunteers performed three simultaneous and three successive tasks. The results revealed two significantly distinguishable coherence patterns corresponding to simultaneous and successive processing. The linking of PASS processes to the brain becomes helpful. For example, in the understanding the loss of sequential and planning functions due to aging in a study of individuals with Down syndrome, using single positron emission topography, Das found that aging individuals with Down syndrome show a bilateral decreased cerebral blood flow in the temporal-parietal region of the brain. The significance of cognitive profiling studies both in impaired and intact brains awaits further discussion in the broader context of the biology of intelligence.

== Remediation and cognitive enhancement ==
One unusual property of the P.A.S.S. theory of cognitive processes is that it has been proven useful for both intellectual assessment (e.g. the CAS) and educational intervention. The theory provides the theoretical framework for the PASS Reading Enhancement Program, a remediation curriculum designed to improve the planning, attention and information processing strategies that underlie reading. A related school-readiness program aims at improving the foundations of cognitive processes in preparation for schooling (Das, 2009). Both are evidence-based intervention programs.

== Challenges ==
A frequently asked question from the critics of PASS is: are Attention and Planning two distinct factors? Kranzler, Keith & Flanagan (2000) found only a marginal fit for the four-factor model; the attention and planning factors were indistinguishable. Recent research on intelligence tests confirms that the most valid score on, for example, the Wechsler Intelligence Scale for Children – Fifth Edition (Canivez, Watkins, & Dombrowski, 2017), Stanford-Binet Fifth Edition (Canivez, 2008), Differential Abilities Scales (Canivez & McGill, 2016), and the Woodcock-Johnson Fourth Edition (Dombrowski, McGill & Canivez, 2017) is the total score that estimates g. That is, the scores which represent the factor based scales these tests provide do not have enough specific variance to be considered interpretable. In fact, a recent reanalysis of Carroll's survey of factor-analytic studies by Benson, Beaujean, McGill, and Dombrowski (2018) concluded that nearly all of the specified abilities presented by Carroll "have little-to-no interpretive relevance above and beyond that of general intelligence (p. 1028)." The only exception to these finding is research reported by Canivez (2011) regarding the Cognitive Assessment System (Naglieri & Das, 1997).

The most recent factor analytic examination of the PASS scales of the CAS Second Edition was conducted by Papadopoulos, Spanoudis and Naglieri (2023) using the standardization sample of the CAS2. The correlated four-factor solution best fits the data above and beyond the one-factor, second-order, bi-factor, and several asymmetrical bi-factor models. These different models, parameterized to allow for indications of the four cognitive factors (i.e., correlated model), a general g factor (i.e., one- and second-order factor models), or a combination of the two (i.e., bi-factors models), revealed that the correlated model accounted for the inter-subtest covariation of the cognitive abilities better than the unitary g factor or the bifactor models. Furthermore, factorial invariance analysis provided evidence that the obtained correlated model, as an index of cognitive processing or intelligence, was the same between genders.
