= Block design test =

Component of many IQ tests

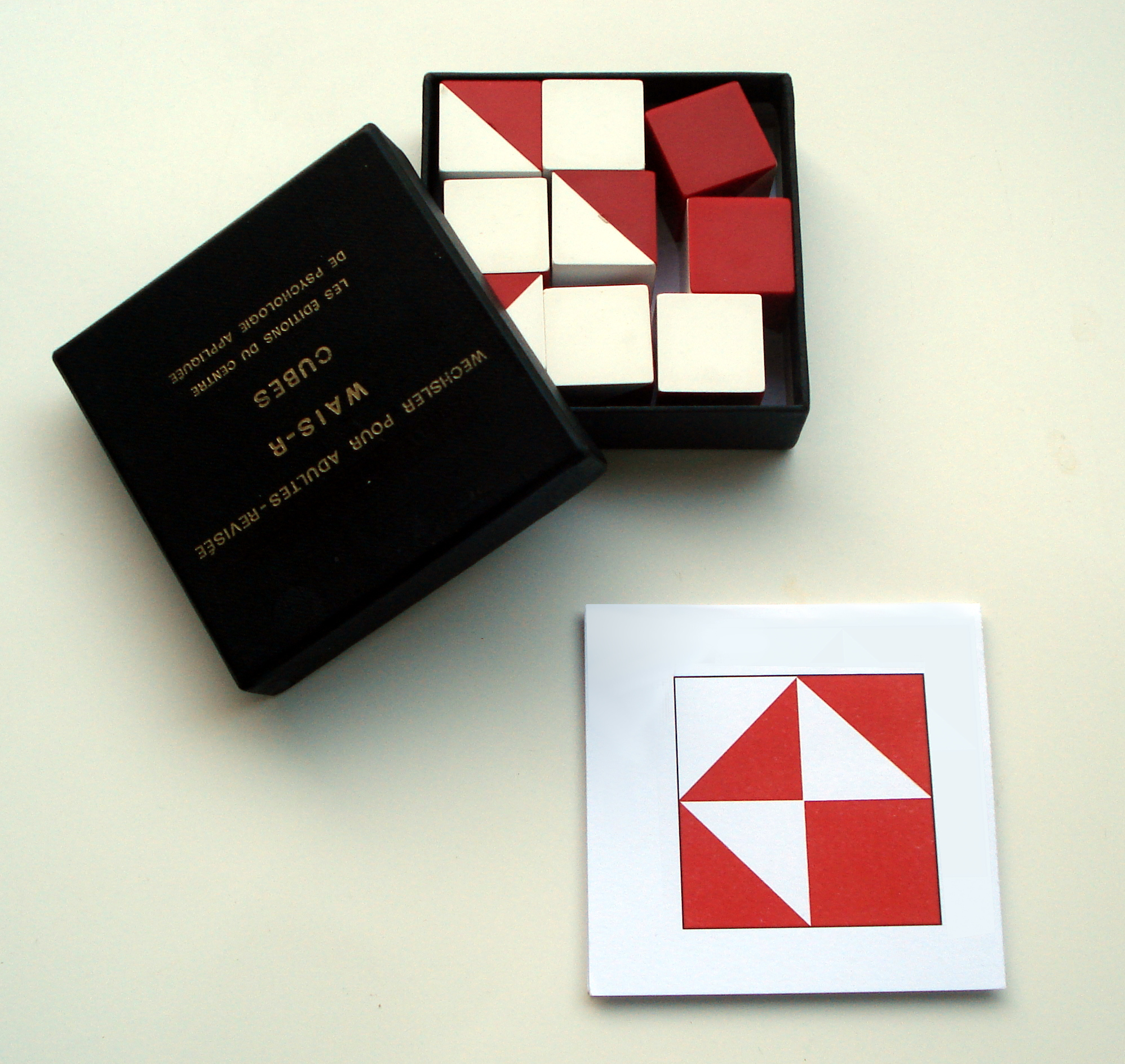
Cubes and a target pattern used in the Wechsler Adult Intelligence Scale test

A block design test is a subtest on many IQ test batteries used as part of assessment of human intelligence. It is thought to tap spatial visualization ability and motor skill. The test-taker uses hand movements to rearrange blocks that have various color patterns on different sides to match a pattern. The items in a block design test can be scored both by accuracy in matching the pattern and by speed in completing each item.

== Historical background ==
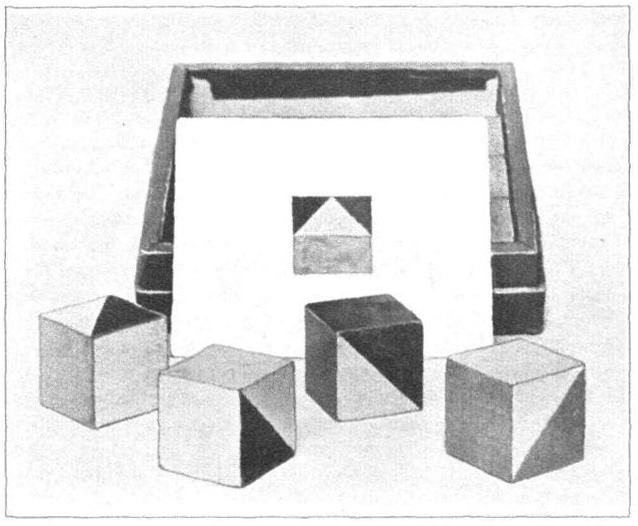
Figure from The Block-Design tests by Kohs (1920) showing, in grayscale, an example of his block test.

David Wechsler adapted a block design subtest for his Wechsler-Bellevue test, the predecessor of his WAIS (Wechsler Adult Intelligence Scale), from the Kohs block design test developed in 1920 at Stanford University by Samuel Calmin Kohs. A later revision of the Kohs test by Hutt incorporated the time taken to complete each item into the scoring of the test. Wechsler followed that practice in making both accuracy and speed factors in scoring the test.

== Neuropsychological assessment ==
Good performance on the block design test is indicative of appropriate functioning of the parietal and frontal lobes. Head injury, Alzheimer's disease, and stroke can severely reduce the performance of an individual on the block design test. Additional evidence suggests impairment in block design performance among schizophrenic and bipolar disorder patient populations.

== Spatial ability ==
The block design test is also a relatively accurate measure of spatial ability and spatial visualization ability used in daily life. The block design test is considered one of the best measures of spatial ability, although it is subject to certain problems of administration, such as anxiety or over-cautious responding. Linda Kreger Silverman has proposed the block design subtest as the best putative measure of spatial ability among the Wechsler subtests.

== Autism spectrum disorders ==
Uta Frith, in her book Autism Explaining the Enigma, addresses the superior performance of autistic individuals on the block design test. This was also addressed in an earlier paper. One article demonstrates the differences in construction time in the performance of the block design task by individuals with and without Asperger syndrome. An essential point is that in an unsegmented version of the task, people with Asperger syndrome performed significantly faster than individuals without Aspergers.

== Science and engineering aptitude ==
Recent research has demonstrated a connection between spatial ability and math and science proficiency at the highest levels. A 2002 study in the Lancet demonstrated that high spatial ability was related to the performance of surgery.

== Spatial ability in pilots ==
In 1993, Dror et al. found that pilots' performance was superior to non-pilots on a test of the speed of mental rotation. Although the block design test is characterized as a test of spatial visualization, not mental rotation, spatial visualization ability as measured by the block design test is highly correlated to mental rotation ability.

== Research in an educational context ==
As performance on the block design test has been suggested as a predictive measure for performance in fields such as engineering and physics. Felder, at North Carolina State University, has developed a learning style questionnaire that attempts to assess spatial ability in an educational context.
