= Spatial intelligence (psychology) =

Area in the theory of multiple intelligences

Spatial intelligence is an area in the theory of multiple intelligences that deals with spatial judgment and the ability to visualize with the mind's eye. It is defined by Howard Gardner as a human computational capacity that provides the ability or mental skill to solve spatial problems of navigation, visualization of objects from different angles and space, faces or scenes recognition, or to notice fine details. Gardner further explains that spatial Intelligence could be more effective to solve problems in areas related to realistic, thing-oriented, and investigative occupations. This capability is a brain skill that is also found in people with visual impairment. As researched by Gardner, a blind person can recognize shapes in a non-visual way. The spatial reasoning of the blind person allows them to translate tactile sensations into mental calculations of length and visualizations of form.

Spatial intelligence is one of the nine intelligences on Howard Gardner's theory of multiple intelligences, each of which is composed of a number of separate sub capacities. An intelligence provides the ability to solve problems or create products that are valued in a particular culture. Each intelligence is a neurally based computational system that is activated by internal or external information. Intelligences are always an interaction between biological proclivities and the opportunities for learning that exist in a culture. The application of this theory in the general practice covers a product range from scientific theories to musical compositions to successful political campaigns. Gardner suggested a general correspondence between each capability with an occupational role in the workplace, for examples: for those individuals with linguistic intelligence he pointed journalists, speakers and trainers; scientists, engineers, financiers and accountants on logical-mathematical intelligence; sales people, managers, teachers and counselors on the personal intelligence; athletes, contractors and actors on bodily-kinesthetic intelligence; taxonomists, ecologists and veterinarians on naturalistic intelligence; clergy and philosophers on existential intelligence and designers, architects and taxi drivers, astronauts, airplane pilots and race car drivers and stunt people on spatial intelligence.

== Different approaches ==
=== Newcombe and Frick ===
In the article, Early Education for spatial intelligence: Why, What and How, Nora Newcombe and Andrea Frick apply the concept of spatial intelligence to the educational realm. Newcombe and Frick approached the concept in different ways:

- Spatial intelligence has evolutionary and adaptive importance. Any mobile organism must be able to navigate in its world to survive and must represent the spatial environment in order to do so. Moving further along the evolutionary timeline, the human ability to make tools is one of the hallmarks of our species.
- Spatial thinking is the principal complement to verbal thinking.
- Spatial thinking aids reasoning in domains that are not, on the surface, obviously spatial. For example, spatial metaphors and diagrams can be used to understand ordered relations (e.g., the ranking of Gross National Product among developing countries) or complex hierarchical relations (e.g., social relationships and biological taxonomies).
- A critically important application of spatial thinking is to the science, technology, engineering, and mathematics (STEM) disciplines. For example, Watson and Crick’s discovery of the structure of DNA occurred when they were able to fit a three-dimensional model to Rosalind Franklin’s flat images of the molecule—clearly a spatial task. Similarly, a geoscientist visualizes the processes that affect the formation of the Earth, an engineer anticipates how various forces may affect the design of a structure, and a neurosurgeon visualizes particular brain areas from magnetic resonance imaging that may determine the outcome of a surgical procedure.
- Spatial intelligence provides the ability to imagine transformations of the orientation of objects (e.g., mental rotations) and the ability to imagine the consequence of observer movements around arrays of objects (i.e., perspective. taking). Mental rotation is the skill for which the strongest evidence exists currently for positing relations with STEM learning, and both mental rotation and perspective taking have been extensively studied from a variety of approaches, including research that has adopted developmental, cognitive, psychometric, and neuroscientific methods.

=== Ness, Farenga, and Garofalo ===
Daniel Ness, Stephen Farenga, and Salvatore Garofalo argue that along with verbal intelligence and logico-mathematical intelligence, spatial intelligence is one of three cognitive domains on which individuals are assessed at some point in their lives. Unlike verbal and logico-mathematical intelligence, however, spatial intelligence is often not assessed on most standardized tests and secondary-level or tertiary-level entrance examinations. Its lack of inclusion on these assessments is problematic because success on questions based on verbal intelligence and logico-mathematical intelligence may fail to tap populations skilled in spatial relations and orientations. Ness, Farenga, and Garofalo also posit that experiences with certain physical objects allow for greater dividends in spatial intelligence. To this end, objects with greater affordance, such as certain LEGO bricks, may impede spatial intelligence while objects with limited affordance, such as cuboidal blocks (i.e., planks) provide for increased spatial intelligence.

=== Van Schaik ===
The architect Leon van Schaik formulates the adoption of spatial intelligence in the field of architecture and design. His first assumption relates to the origin of architecture in the human computational capacity to organize themselves spatially; based on people's own ideas about space, histories in space and communal mental space; all have been a combination that has evolved into society over millennia. Van Schaik explains how spatial intelligence works and how it is linked to the way individuals assess their surroundings. His comments are based on the research done by Roger Penrose, Shadows of the Mind. The awareness of what happens around someone comes from cells in the human body with enormous calculating capabilities, "intelligence is a distributed system: not something held like a command centre in the brain and then distributed, but something that is present throughout the organism, and linked together through the nervous system". An example to explain this human capability is similar to the ways spatial intelligence works in kinetic environments. Like the ability in which football players compute and execute the exact angle and force required to score a goal from a free kick. Another example of distributed intelligence at work is in the Australian Aboriginal Art. Aboriginal dot painting is a representation of the landscape inhabited by them with a surprising resemblance to the real space. It shows watercourses, animal shelter, where the edible plant are and all dimensions and spatial arrangement has been learned through a constant exposure to the world surrounding them, by walking, hunting, stalking, spearing. Van Schaik argues about the influence of spatial intelligence in the creation of engaging spaces. His assumption is to create a better relation between internal and external environments, and it requires the use of the best available knowledge, which in his opinion, involves the designer's spatial intelligence and mental space; the new informational environment that enables the professional designer to communicate more interactively and inclusively. In van Schaik point of view, this new process of understanding space will provide the chance to forge new kinds of unity between architecture and the communities it seeks to serve: the commission of spatial intelligence is leading architecture's domain into a new discipline that venture into new spatial formulations, new roles and new approaches. Van Schaik also pointed that architecture has to be more than the production of branded consumable, it has to be capable to influence the individuals deeper history, a benign and malevolent influence in people's lives. For van Schaik, some of the most influencing architects using spatial intelligence in combination of their community's mental space are: Peter Zumthor, Sean Godsell, Herzog and de Meuron, Zaha Hadid and Kathryn Findlay.

=== Komninos ===
Nicos Komninos applies the concept of spatial intelligence to cities, and defined the idea as the ability of a community to use its intellectual capital, institutions and material infrastructure to deal with a range of problems and challenges. Spatial intelligence emerges from the agglomeration and integration of three types of intelligence: the inventiveness, creativity and intellectual capital of the city's population; the collective intelligence of the city's institutions and social capital; and the artificial intelligence of public and citywide smart infrastructure, virtual environments and intelligent agents. Using this spatially combined intellectual capacity, cities can respond effectively to changing socio-economic conditions, address challenges, plan their future, and sustain the prosperity and well-being of citizens.

=== Gopnik ===
Adam Gopnik defines spatial intelligence as the ability to grasp a changing whole and anticipate its next stage; the ability to make quick decisions; to size up all the relationships in a fast-changing array and understand them. A related notion is that of situational awareness: a heightened consciousness of the individual's surroundings and both the intentions of the people around and their anticipated actions. Gopnik claims that the power of spatial intelligence and situational awareness are fully explained in the practice of hockey. Gopnik explains that hockey reveals and rewards situational and spatial intelligence like no other sport. Gopnik's example refers to the ability of the hockey player Wayne Gretzky as a gift of spatial and situational intelligence: knowing what is going to happen in three seconds, anticipating the pattern approaching by seeing the pattern instantaneously, sussing out the goalie's next decision and other players' eventual trajectories in what would be a single glance if a glance were even taken. “Gretzky is the extreme expression of the common skill the game demands”.

=== Rendell and Rawes ===
Jane Rendell and Peg Rawes research on Spatial Imagination in Design demonstrates that an individual's sensory and perceptual engagement with an environment or space is, in part, constructed by their powers of imagination. For Rendell and Rawes spatial imagination works in a specific political and cultural imagination as belonging to the individual designer and user. The results of this contextual understanding will inform and reflect the specific cultural, historical and political diversity and value of the architectural and built environment to the design community and beyond.

== See also ==
- Aptitude
- Outline of human intelligence
- Intelligence quotient
- Spatial ability
