= Jack Naglieri =

American psychologist and research professor

- Born: Jack Anthony Naglieri; 1950 (age 75–76)
- Education: LIU Post; St. John's University; University of Georgia
- Known for: Das–Naglieri cognitive assessment system
- Scientific career
- Fields: School psychology
- Institutions: George Mason University; University of Virginia
- Thesis: A comparison of McCarthy GCI and WISC-R IQ scores for educable mentally retarded, learning disabled and normal children (1979)
- Doctoral advisor: Alan S. Kaufman

Jack Anthony Naglieri (born 1950) is an American school psychologist and research professor at the University of Virginia. He is also a senior research scientist at the Devereux Center for Resilient Children and an emeritus professor at George Mason University, as well as a former professor at Ohio State University. He is known for his development of the Naglieri Nonverbal Ability Test and (with Jagannath Prasad Das) the Das–Naglieri Cognitive Assessment System.
