= Verbal reasoning =

Understanding and reasoning using concepts framed in words

Verbal reasoning is understanding and reasoning using concepts framed in words. It aims at evaluating ability to think constructively, rather than at simple fluency or vocabulary recognition.

== Verbal reasoning tests ==
Verbal reasoning tests of intelligence provide an assessment of an individual's ability to think, reason and solve problems in different ways. For this reason, verbal reasoning tests are often used as entrance examinations by schools, colleges and universities to select the most able applicants. Additionally, such tests are also used by a growing number of employers as part of the selection/recruitment process.

=== WAIS-III ===
The Wechsler Adult Intelligence Scale III (WAIS-III) divides Verbal IQ (VIQ) into two categories:

- Verbal Comprehension Index (VCI) – vocabulary, similarities, information, and comprehension.
- Working Memory Index (WMI) – arithmetic, digit span, and letter-number sequencing.

=== LSAT ===
The Law School Admission Test (LSAT) is a classic measure that evaluates the verbal reasoning ability of participants who are applying to a graduate law school. The multiple choice sections are broken up into three parts:

- Reading Comprehension – ability to understand complex language material like paragraphs or passages and able to answer questions regarding them.
- Analytical reasoning – ability to understand relationships in language material like statements or passages and being able to draw reasonable conclusions from them.
- Logical reasoning – Using critical thinking to assess and complete an argument given on the test.

=== Verbal reasoning in recruitment ===
Large graduate training schemes are increasingly using verbal reasoning tests (verbals) to distinguish among applicants. The verbal reasoning tests used in these assessments are typically designed to evaluate candidates' understanding and comprehension skills. Verbal reasoning tests are often used during recruitment for positions in many industries, such as banking, finance, management consulting, mining and accounting. The tests are used as an efficient way to short list candidates for later stages of the recruitment process, such as interview. When used in recruitment, the tests normally include a series of text passages regarding a random topic. Then there will be a series of statements regarding the passages. The candidate must then determine if the statement is true, false or they can not tell (it is ambiguous). The candidate is not expected to know anything about the topics, and the answer is to be based purely on the information in the passage.

== Concepts ==
This section of the article briefly explains the general elements of verbal reasoning in order of increasing complexity.

=== Vocabulary and grammar ===
Vocabulary (the knowledge of words' meanings in a language) and grammar (knowledge of words' proper relation to one another in a language) can function both as prerequisites as well as topics of focus of verbal reasoning. In the former capacity, they are used to form propositions and arguments (see below), while in the latter capacity they are the subject of analysis and evaluation, where verbal reasoning synthesizes linguistic information and analyzes relationships among component parts of sentences, words, and concepts.

=== Propositions ===
The basic element of reasoning (verbal, or otherwise) is the proposition. A proposition is simply the meaning behind a declarative sentence that can be either true or false (note: special care is taken here to mention that the proposition is specifically what is meant by such a sentence, and is not the actual sentence itself). In other words, a proposition is something that one can know, believe, think, assume, or so on. Worth explicitly mentioning here is that only some (and not necessarily all) statements count as propositions. This is because the defining feature of a proposition is that it is necessarily making some assertion which can intelligibly be assigned a truth value. In other words: statements are only propositions if they are Truth-apt. To illustrate this principled distinction, let us consider the following two statements:

- "The sky is blue."
- "Tell me your name."

The first sentence is a proposition because it purports a fact which is either true or untrue. The second sentence, however, is not a proposition, because it does not appear to make any true/false assertion (that is, there is nothing meant by the sentence that one could say were or weren't "true").

=== Premises and conclusions ===
A premise is a proposition in an argument which will justify or induce a conclusion. That is, premises are propositions which, if true, allow for the logical inference of an associated proposition which is known as the "conclusion". To give an example: the statement "John is a bachelor" is a premise in the one-sentence argument "John is a bachelor, therefore John is unmarried", and the conclusion is that "John is unmarried". Premises may be treated somewhat differently according to the specific type of argument in which they occur. In a deductive argument, premises are often assumed to be true — regardless of whether or not they really are. This is juxtaposed against inductive arguments, in which there is merely a chance of some premise(s) (and/or conclusion(s)) being true.

=== Arguments and reason ===
An argument is a series of premises together with one or more conclusion(s). Arguments can serve a variety of purposes, ranging from determining the degree of truth of a conclusion, to persuading individuals to accept or reject some belief(s) (as in the case of rhetoric). An additional note on arguments is that they may take a number of different forms, including that of a syllogism, essay, or dialogue (among others). To the extent which argument overlaps with and is reliant upon language, it may be considered one of the central concerns of verbal reasoning (or for that matter any reasoning, at large).

At this point a sort of maximal scope has been reached, wherein it is appropriate to point out and address the issue of circularity. Insofar as verbal reasoning is used to create and analyze arguments of language, while at the same time arguments (using language as their vehicle) are used to exercise and analyze reasoning, there will be some inevitable degree of circularity between the two. This point offers a fitting conclusion to the current section, and serves to reiterate the importance of verbal reasoning.

== See also ==
- Verbal intelligence
- Outline of human intelligence
- Test (assessment)
- Theory of multiple intelligences
- Philosophy of language
