= Das–Naglieri Cognitive Assessment System =

Psychological theories

The Das–Naglieri Cognitive Assessment System (CAS) test is an individually administered test of cognitive functioning for children and adolescents ranging from 5 through 17 years of age that was designed to assess the planning, attention, simultaneous and successive cognitive processes as described in the PASS theory of intelligence.

== History ==
CAS development began with an attempt to offer an alternative to the IQ test (Das, Kirby & Jarman, 1975, 1979). Developed and published in 1997 by J.P. Das, PhD of the University of Alberta and Jack Naglieri, PhD, then at Ohio State University, the CAS has its theoretical bases both in the neuropsychology of Luria as well as in cognitive psychology.

CAS is based on the planning, attention-arousal, simultaneous and successive (PASS) cognitive processing theory (or the PASS Theory of Intelligence), a modern theory within the information-processing framework (Das, Naglieri & Kirby, 1994). Roots of CAS are in Luria's (1973) organization of cognitive functions in the brain as well as in cognitive psychology of Baddeley, Estes, Posner and other contemporary psychologists. Their work has guided the selection and interpretation of CAS tests.

The Kaufman Assessment Battery for Children or KABC by (Alan S. Kaufman, 1983 ) is perhaps the first battery of commercially available tests to provide a psychometric assessment of cognitive processes. K-ABC has used several references to the early research of Das and his colleagues (Das, Kirby & Jarman, 1979) on simultaneous and successive processing, a precursor to PASS theory. KABC did not assess the Arousal-Attention, and Planning functions, as CAS did, until K-ABC II appeared in 2004. The latter provides two theoretical bases, one of them in Luria (1966) and by default, the 4 PASS processes) and the other in Cattell-Horn-Carroll model (CHC) which is essentially an elaboration of fluid and crystallized intelligence (McGrew 2005). Some may consider this a strength of KABC-II. However, two important features of CAS have set it apart from ability measures within fluid and crystallized abilities of CHC, and verbal-performance IQ:

- CAS is a system of assessment of 'processes', not abilities. Ability tests such as WISC/WAIS
- those that measure fluid and crystallized abilities address different constructs than process assessments. CAS process measures may have the same contents in several of its sub-tests (i.e. verbal, as in Simultaneous Verbal, and Word-series, see next section) but the codes are different (Simultaneous contrasted with Successive. see McCrea 2009 for further discussion).

== The CAS battery ==
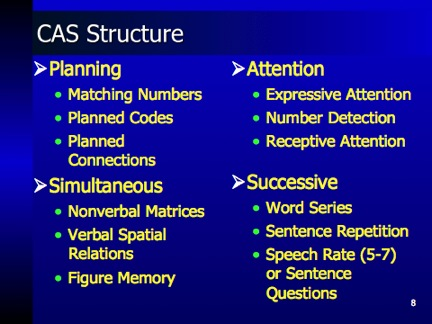
Cognitive process subtests in the CAS battery

The CAS standard battery consists of three subtests for each PASS Scale (12 subtests in all) whereas the basic battery has 2 subtests for each scale (8 in total). It takes an hour to administer the standard battery and 40 minutes for the basic battery (Naglieri & Das, 1997).

The CAS battery provides a standard score for each process as well as a Full Scale standard score. The average internal reliability coefficients across ages 15–17 for the PASS scales are:

- Planning = .88
- Attention = .88
- Simultaneous = .93
- Successive = .93
- Full Scale = .96.

Each of these scales are described in detail below. For further explanation, see Naglieri, 1999 (B), Naglieri & Das (2005). Additional details on the origin of each of the 12 tests in CAS have been discussed at some length in Das, Naglieri &Kirby (1994) and more recently in a review by McCrea (2009).

=== Planning Scale ===
Planning helps us select or develop strategies needed to complete tasks for which a solution is needed, and is critical to all activities where an individual has to determine how to solve a problem The Planning scale includes matching numbers, planned codes, and planned connections.

In the matching numbers subtest, children are presented with four pages containing eight rows of numbers. The child is instructed to underline the two numbers that are the same.

The planned codes subtest contains two pages, each with a distinct set of codes arranged in seven rows and eight columns. At the top of each page is a legend that indicates how letters relate to simple codes (e.g., A = OX; B = XX; C = OO). In the planned connections (a variation of Trails test) subtest the child is instructed to connect numbers in sequence that appear in a quasi-random order (e.g., 1–2–3, etc.). For these two tests, the child connects numbers and letters in sequential order, alternating between numbers and letters (e.g., 1-A-2-B, etc.).

All Planning subtests include strategy assessment. This is conducted after the administration of each subtest and recorded in two categories:

- Observed strategies – those seen by the examiner
- Reported strategies – those obtained following completion of an item (Naglieri, 1999 A).

=== Attention Scale ===
Attention is a mental process that involves focusing on selected aspects of external events, internal events, or stimuli. Attention is controlled by intentions and goals. The Attention scale includes the expressive attention, number detection, and receptive attention subtests.

Expressive attention (a variation of the Stroop test) has two forms, one for children 7 years and younger, and the other 8 & over.

The receptive attention subtest contains two separate tasks; in the first task, targets are letters that are physically the same (e.g., BB but not Bb). For the second task, targets are letters that have the same name (e.g., Bb but not Ab). This subtest is an adaptation of Posner & Boise (1971).

=== Simultaneous Scale ===
Simultaneous processing is essential for organization of information into groups or a coherent whole. It requires both nonverbal and verbal processing for the analyses and synthesis of logical and grammatical components of language and comprehension of word relationships. The Simultaneous scale has nonverbal matrices, verbal spatial relations, and figure memory.

Nonverbal matrices items present a variety of shapes; it is similar to Progressive Matrices.

Verbal spatial relations subtest measures the comprehension of logical and grammatical descriptions of spatial relationships. In this subtest, the child is presented with six drawings, arranged in a specific spatial manner, and a printed question (e.g., show me the triangle to the left of the circle). The child is instructed to choose one of the six drawings that best answers the question.

In Figure memory, a combination of Figure-Copying and Memory for Designs, the child is presented a two- or three-dimensional geometric figure for 5 seconds and then presented immediately with a response page, on which the original geometric figure is embedded in a larger, more complex geometric pattern. The child is asked to identify the original design.

=== Successive Scale ===
Successive processing is involved whenever information must be remembered or completed in a specific order or sequence. The Successive scale has word series, sentence repetition, and sentence questions.

In word series, the examiner reads the child a series of words and then asks to repeat the words in the same order.

Sentence repetition requires the child to read 20 sentences aloud one by one. After each sentence is read, the child is asked to repeat the sentence exactly as presented.

The sentence questions subtest uses the same type of sentences that are used in the sentence repetition subtest. However, now the child is read a sentence and asked a question about it. For example, the examiner reads "The blue yellows the green" and asks the child "Who yellows the green?" In a modified form, it has been used as a test of working memory.

Speech Rate (Ages 5 to 7) is an 8-item timed subtest that requires the child to repeat a string of 3 common words, such as dog-girl-book, over and over again as fast as possible until asked to stop. The score is the time it takes the child to complete 10 repetitions before stopping.

== Present use ==
CAS is used for understanding cognitive development of typical and atypical children, as well as cognitive impairment in adults. It has been used for research, diagnosis, and clinical evaluation by several professionals including educational and school psychologists because it provides good guidelines for educational interventions.

Research on the relationship between the CAS and achievement has shown that the PASS processes strongly predict academic achievement in spite of the fact that it does not include vocabulary (Naglieri and Rojahn, 2004). Similarly, CAS tests have been used for understanding, assessment of and intervention with educational problems associated with reading disabilities (Das, 2009 ) such as autism, attention-deficit-hyperactivity disorder (Naglieri, 2005). CAS tests have also been used for clinical evaluation of intellectual disability and cognitive changes in ageing (Das, 2003).

Deserving of special mention is the use of CAS tests for fair assessment of minorities (Naglieri, 2005) and First Nation children whose chronic weakness in reading has been identified as a successive processing deficit compounded by poor home literacy (Das, Janzen & Georgiou, 2007) both of which can be improved through PASS-related intervention (Hayward, Das & Janzen, 2007).

Additionally, CAS with supplementary tests has been found useful for research related to executive decision making in management (Das, Kar, & Parrila, 1996).

CAS withstands adaptation and translation into other languages. CAS in Dutch, Italian, Japanese, Korean, Spanish (Castilian), Norwegian and Swedish are commercially available. In addition, CAS has been used in Chinese, Greek, Norwegian and Dutch research.

== Criticisms ==
The CAS meets at least two challenges, first in terms of its factor-analytic purity (Naglieri & Das, 1997 Interpretive handbook), and second in extending its scope by supplementary tests, especially for assessment of Executive Functions.

The validity of CAS comprising the 4 PASS constructs is adequately supported by several books and studies (Das, Naglieri, & Kirby, 1994; Das, Kar & Parilla, 1996; Das, 2009). The CAS Interpretive Handbook, (Naglieri and Das, 1997) reported information about the factor structure of the CAS providing evidence that the PASS four-factor solution was the best solution based on the convergence of factor-analytic results, clinical utility of the four separate scores, evidence of strategy use and theoretical interpretation of the subtests.

Keith and Kranzler (1999) challenged this position and argued that there was insufficient support. Naglieri (1999 B) and Puhan, Das & Naglieri (2005) responded with reasonable evidence and rational arguments in defense of the structure of the test and the validity of the 4-factor CAS. However, the issue has not yet been resolved as yet.

Insofar as constructive criticism goes, supplementary tests are necessary for extending the application of CAS. To begin with existing tests, the Successive subtests should have a nonverbal measure, such as Luria's test that asks participants to continue a series "+++__ __+++__ __+++__ __......", or a motor response of tapping to dot sequences such as "... .. ... .. ... ... .. " as given in Das, Kirby & Jarman (1979).

Similarly, Attention subtests should include both a continuous performance test, and a more cognitively loaded vigilance test (Das, Naglieri & Kirby, 1994). In regard to Executive Functions, one would notice that elements of it are already included in CAS : Expressive attention (Stroop) = inhibition of response; Planned Connection (Trails) = shifting. But the existing Planning scale must be supplemented by tests of complex planning (Das, Kar & Parrila, 1996), and so-called 'hot' tests that involve affective decision making, such as the predicament test (Channon, 2004).

== See also ==
- Fluid and crystallized intelligence
- Naglieri Nonverbal Ability Test
- PASS Theory of Intelligence
- Psychology of Play (Lev Vygotsky)
