= Rex Jung =

American psychologist

Rex Eugene Jung is an American psychologist who has researched on the neural basis of human intelligence and creativity. He is an assistant professor at the University of New Mexico, where he is the director of neuropsychological services. Jung is also a practicing psychologist at his private clinic.

== Education and academic duties ==
Jung obtained a bachelor's degree from the University of Colorado Boulder in 1986 and obtained his PhD in clinical psychology from the University of New Mexico in 2001. Jung is a member of the American Psychological Association (division 40, clinical neuropsychology), the International Society of Intelligence Research (ISIR), and Heterodox Academy. Jung sits on the editorial board of Intelligence, Frontiers in Psychiatry (neuroimaging and stimulation), and Public Library of Science (PLoS ONE).

== Research ==
Jung has published more than 100 peer-reviewed papers, most of which deal with intelligence or creativity.

In 2007, Richard Haier and Jung published a study advocating the parieto-frontal integration theory (P-FIT) of intelligence.

Jung has published papers on the neuroscience of creativity. Due to his work on creativity, Jung has been interviewed in media such as The New York Times, The Atlantic, and The Washington Post.

== Bibliography ==
- Jung, Rex; Vartanian, Oshin, eds. (2018). The Cambridge handbook of the neuroscience of creativity. Cambridge Handbooks in Psychology. Cambridge University Press. ISBN 978-1316602102.
