= Volkmar Weiss =

German researcher and writer (born 1944)

Volkmar Weiss (born 23 May 1944 in Zwickau, Saxony) is a German researcher and writer, primarily interested in the field of IQ research. He is mostly known for his controversial thesis that intelligence is fixed to social class, and for his association with the right-wing extremist politics.

He was a member of the German Christian Democratic Union (CDU) from 1990 to 1993.

== Non-fiction ==
- Psychogenetik: Humangenetik in Psychologie und Psychiatrie. VEB Gustav Fischer, Jena 1982, ISSN 0435-284X. Reprint in: Volkmar Weiss, Siegfried Lehrl, Helmar Frank: Psychogenetik der Intelligenz. (Beiband zu Jahrgang 27, 1986 der Vierteljahresschrift GrKG, Grundlagenstudien aus Kybernetik und Geisteswissenschaft) Verlag Modernes Lernen, Dortmund 1986, ISBN 3-8080-0106-2.
- Bevölkerung und soziale Mobilität: Sachsen 1550-1880. Akademie-Verlag, Berlin 1993, ISBN 3-05-001973-5 (PDF; 131 MB).
- with Katja Münchow: Ortsfamilienbücher mit Standort Leipzig. 2. Auflage. Degener, Neustadt/Aisch 1998, ISBN 3-7686-2099-9, darin: Bearbeitete Fragen und Methoden bei der wissenschaftlichen Auswertung von Ortsfamilienbüchern und ihren Vorstufen. S. 74-176
- Die IQ-Falle: Intelligenz, Sozialstruktur und Politik. Leopold Stocker Verlag, Graz 2000, ISBN 3-7020-0882-9.
- Die Intelligenz und ihre Feinde: Aufstieg und Niedergang der Industriegesellschaft. Ares Verlag, Graz 2012, ISBN 978-3-902732-01-9.
- Vorgeschichte und Folgen des arischen Ahnenpasses. Zur Geschichte der Genealogie im 20. Jahrhundert. Arnshaugk Verlag, Neustadt an der Orla 2013, ISBN 978-3-944064-11-6.
- Die rote Pest aus grüner Sicht: Springkräuter - von Imkern geschätzt, von Naturschützern bekämpft. Leopold Stocker Verlag, Graz 2015, ISBN 978-3-7020-1506-0.
- Das IQ-Gen - verleugnet seit 2015: Eine bahnbrechende Entdeckung und ihre Feinde. Ares Verlag, Graz 2017, ISBN 978-3-902732-87-3.
- Keine Willkommenskultur für Douglasien im deutschen Walde?. Neustadt an der Orla: Arnshaugk 2017, ISBN 978-3-944064-76-5.
- IQ Means Inequality. The Population Cycle that Drives Human History?. KDP Independent Publishing 2020, ISBN 979-8608184406.
- Local Population Studies in Central Europe: A Review of Historical Demography and Social History. KDP Independent Publishing 2020, ISBN 979-8653882180.
- German Genealogy in Its Social and Political Context. KDP Independent Publishing 2020, ISBN 979-8667675457.

== Novels ==
- Artam: One Reich, One Race, a Tenth Leader. Smashwords 2014, ISBN 9781310255106
