= Naglieri Nonverbal Ability Test =

Cognitive test

The Naglieri Nonverbal Ability Test (NNAT) is a nonverbal measure of general ability designed by Jack A. Naglieri and published by Pearson Education. The Naglieri Nonverbal Ability Test - Individual Form was first published in 1998. Two versions were published in 2007 and 2008, respectively. This includes the group administered Naglieri Nonverbal Ability Test - Second Edition and the Naglieri Nonverbal Ability Test - Online version. The most current version is NNAT3. Like all nonverbal ability tests, the NNAT is intended to assess cognitive ability independently of linguistic and cultural background.

== Present use ==
These tests may be administered to K–12 school children on an individual or group basis as a means to identify potentially gifted children for placement in accelerated programs. It is also used for admission by several high IQ societies; for instance Intertel accepts scores at or above the 99th percentile.

== NNAT and the media ==
Beginning in the 2012-13 school year, the Naglieri Nonverbal Ability Test- 2nd Edition (NNAT-2) replaced the Bracken School Readiness Assessment (BSRA) in New York City. The decision sparked some controversy because some parents considered the test too difficult.

In New York City, the NNAT-2 makes up 50% of the gifted and talented exam, the other 50% is the Otis–Lennon School Ability Test (OLSAT).

== Criticism ==
The NNAT has been found by one study to show excessive score variability, with within-grade standard deviations reaching as high as 20 points. This has the effect of both overrepresenting and underrepresenting index scores - that is, more students received very high or very low scores than expected. Lohman et al. found that 3.4 times as many students scored in the 130+ range on the NNAT as expected.

== See also ==
- Cognitive Abilities Test (CogAT, CAT)
- Cognitive test
- Das–Naglieri Cognitive Assessment System (CAS)
- Educational psychology
- Intelligence quotient
- Otis-Lennon School Ability Test (OLSAT)
- Raven's Progressive Matrices
- School psychology
- Stanford Binet
- Wechsler Intelligence Scale for Children (WISC)
