= Educational quotient =

An educational quotient, or EQ, is a score designed to assess a subject's level of general education. Though related to intelligence quotient, there is no direct correlation between the two. A person of high IQ, may have a low EQ, and vice versa.

A person's EQ is generally found by dividing the results of their Wide Range Achievement Test by their IQ and multiplying by 100, or by dividing their Education Age by their Chronological Age and multiplying by 100.
