= Controlled Oral Word Association Test =

Verbal fluency test

- Synonyms: COWAT
- Purpose: verbal fluency test

Controlled Oral Word Association Test, abbreviated COWA or COWAT, is a verbal fluency test that measures spontaneous production of words belonging to the same category or beginning with some designated letter.

== History ==
The test was first called the "Verbal Associative Fluency Test", and then was changed to the "Controlled Word Association Test".

== Procedure ==
The participant is usually asked to name words beginning with a letter, excluding proper nouns, for one minute and this procedure is repeated three times. The most commons letters used are FAS because of their frequency in the English language. The examiner must quickly write down the words provided by the participant on a piece of paper. The whole examination usually takes 5–10 minutes.
