= Parieto-frontal integration theory =

Neuroscience theory of human intelligence

The parieto-frontal integration theory (P-FIT) considers intelligence to relate to how well different brain regions integrate to form intelligent behaviors. The theory proposes that large scale brain networks connect brain regions, including regions within frontal, parietal, temporal, and cingulate cortices, underlie the biological basis of human intelligence. These regions, which overlap significantly with the task-positive network, allow the brain to communicate and exchange information efficiently with one another. Support for this theory is primarily based on neuroimaging evidence, with support from lesion studies. The P-FIT is influential in that it explains the majority of current neuroimaging findings, as well as increasing empirical support for cognition being the result of large-scale brain networks, rather than numerous domain-specific processes or modules. A 2010 review of the neuroscience of intelligence described P-FIT as "the best available answer to the question of where in the brain intelligence resides".

== The theory ==
General intelligence requires specific brain regions and incorporates:

- Sensory processing, primarily in the visual and auditory modalities, including specific temporal and parietal areas
- Sensory abstracting and elaboration by the parietal cortex (especially the supramarginal, superior parietal, and angular gyri)
- Interaction between the parietal cortex and frontal lobes for hypothesis testing available solutions
- Response selection and inhibition of competing responses by the anterior cingulate

This theory proposes that greater general intelligence in individuals results from the greater communication efficiency between the dorsolateral prefrontal cortex, parietal lobe, anterior cingulate cortex, and specific temporal and parietal cortex regions.

== Neuroimaging evidence ==
=== Jung and Haier (2007) ===
Jung and Haier (2007) proposed the P-FIT in a review of 37 neuroimaging studies with a total of 1,557 participants. The review included only neuroimaging techniques with high spatial resolution to examine the structural and functional correlates of intelligence. Across the structural neuroimaging studies (using voxel-based morphometry, magnetic resonance spectroscopy, and diffusion tensor imaging), Jung and Haier found that the full scale IQ scores from the Wechsler Intelligence scales correlated with frontal and parietal regions in more than 40% of 11 studies. More than 30% of studies using full-scale IQ as their intelligence measure correlated with left cingulate as well as both left and right frontal regions. However, there were no observed structural correlations between regions in the temporal or occipital lobes with any of the intelligence scales. The authors attribute this contradictory finding to the task-dependency of relationships between intellectual performance and these brain regions.

Across functional studies, the authors found that more than 40% of the studies, included in the review, found correlations between bilateral activations in the frontal and occipital cortices and intelligence. In these studies, activation in the left hemisphere was usually significantly higher than that of the right hemisphere. Similarly, bilateral cortical areas in the occipital lobe, such as BA (Brodmann area) 19 were activated during reasoning tasks in more than 40% of studies. Here left activation tended also to be greater than activation in the right hemisphere.

Across the functional imaging studies reviewed, the parietal lobe was consistently involved in reasoning tasks, with BA 7 activated in more than 70% of studies and BA 40 activation was observed in more than 60% of studies.

In recognition of the correlational nature of neuroimaging, the authors complement their neuroimaging review with a shorter review of evidence from lesion studies and imaging genomics regarding the biological basis of intelligence. The authors conclude that the lesion evidence supports a P-FIT theory of intelligence. Further, based on the imaging genomic studies reviewed, the authors suggest a mediating role of ASPM and microcephalin genes in the relationship between volumes of gray and white matter of the areas implicated in the P-FIT theory.

=== Further structural imaging evidence ===
Haier et al. (2009) provided further neuroimaging evidence for the P-FIT by investigating the correlation between g and gray matter volume. This was in order to see whether psychometric g is consistently related to a certain neural substrate, or a neuro-g. The authors argue that previous studies examining the neural correlates of g have mostly used indirect measures of g, render the findings of these studies as inconclusive. The scores of 6292 participants on eight cognitive tests were used to derive g, and a small subset of 40 participants were also scanned using voxel-based morphometry. The evidence indicates that the neural correlates of g depend on part on the type of test used to derive g, despite evidence indicating that g derived from different tests tap onto the same underlying psychometric construct. The authors suggest that this may, in part, explain some of the variance in the neuroimaging findings reviewed by Jung and Haier (2007).

In the same year, a study by Colom and colleagues also measured the gray matter correlates of g in a sample of 100 healthy Spanish adults. Similar to Haier et al. (2009), a direct measure of g was derived from a battery measuring fluid, crystallized, and spatial aspects of intelligence. Although finding some differences between the P-FIT theory and their results, the authors conclude that their findings support the P-FIT theory. The identified inconsistencies include voxel clusters in the frontal eye fields, the inferior and middle temporal gyrus, areas which are involved in planning complex movements, high-level visual processing, respectively.

=== Functional imaging evidence ===
Vakhtin et al. (2014) determined to identify functional networks relating to fluid intelligence, as measured by both the standard and advanced versions of Raven's Progressive Matrices test. Using fMRI, Vakhtin et al. found a discrete set of networks associated with fluid reasoning, including the dorsolateral cortex, inferior and parietal lobule, anterior cingulate, as well as temporal and occipital regions. The authors argue that this is "broadly consistent" with the P-FIT theory. The authors scanned 79 American university students three times each, wherein one session was at 'resting state', and in the other two the participants were asked to complete problems taken from Raven's Standard and Advanced Progressive Matrices. Attentional, cognitive, sensorimotor, visual, and default-mode networks were activated during the reasoning task.

== Evidence from lesion studies ==
The majority of studies providing lesion evidence to the P-FIT theory use voxel-based lesion symptom mapping, a method in which scores on an intelligence test battery are compared between participants with and without a lesion at every voxel. This allows for the identification of regions with a causal role in performance on test measures, as it maps where brain damage can impact performance.

Gläscher et al. (2010) explored whether g has distinct neural substrates, or whether it is related to global neural properties such as total brain volume. Using voxel-based lesion symptom mapping, Gläscher et al. (2010) found significant relationships between g scores and regions in primarily the left hemisphere, and major white matter tract regions in temporal, parietal, and inferior frontal areas. Only one brain area was unique to g, which was Brodmann Area 10 in the left frontal pole. The remaining areas activated by g were shared with subtests of the Wechsler Adult Intelligence Scale (WAIS), the test battery used to calculate g.

A study of 182 male veterans from the Phase 3 Vietnam Head Injury Study registry causally identifies several areas implicated in the P-FIT theory. Barbey, Colom, Solomon, Krueger, and Forbes (2012) use voxel-based lesion symptom mapping to identify regions that interfere with performance on the WAIS and the Delis-Kaplan executive function system. The authors only include the five measures from the Delis-Kaplan system that are known to be especially sensitive to frontal lobe damage. The findings indicate that g, calculated from the WAIS test battery, shared neural substrates with several WAIS subtests, such as Verbal Comprehension, Working Memory, Perceptual Organization, and Processing Speed. The areas implicated are known to be involved in language processing, working memory, spatial processing, and motor processing, as well as major white matter tracts, including the arcuate fasciculus which connects temporal, parietal, and inferior frontal regions. The frontal and parietal lobes were found to be critical for executive control processes, which was demonstrated by significantly worse performance on specific executive functioning subtests in participants with damage to frontal and parietal regions, as well as the white matter tracts connecting these regions, such as the superior fronto-occipital fasciculus.

== Issues with the theory ==
There is little published criticism of the P-FIT, and it stands as the best current model for the biological basis of human intelligence. Nevertheless, questions remain regarding the biological functioning of intelligence. A review of the methods used to identify large-scale networks involved in cognition highlights the importance of multi-dimensional context in understanding the neural bases of cognitive processes. Although this review does not directly criticize the P-FIT, the authors caution that structural imaging and lesion studies, although helpful in implicating specific regions in processes, do little to elucidate the dynamical nature of cognitive processes. Furthermore, a review of the neuroscience of intelligence emphasizes the need of studies to consider the different cognitive and neural strategies individuals may use in completing cognitive tasks.

== Compatibility with other biological correlates of intelligence ==
The P-FIT is highly compatible with the neural efficiency hypothesis, and is supported by evidence of the relationship between white matter integrity and intelligence. For example, a study indicates that white matter integrity provides the neural basis for the rapid processing of information, which is considered central to general intelligence.
