= Effect of health on intelligence =

Health can affect intelligence in various ways. Conversely, intelligence can affect health. Health effects on intelligence have been described as being among the most important factors in the origins of human group differences in IQ test scores and other measures of cognitive ability. Several factors can lead to significant cognitive impairment, particularly if they occur during pregnancy and childhood when the brain is growing and the blood–brain barrier of the child is less effective. Such impairment may sometimes be permanent, sometimes be partially or wholly compensated for by later growth.

Developed nations have implemented several health policies regarding nutrients and toxins known to influence cognitive function. These include laws requiring fortification of certain food products and laws establishing safe levels of pollutants (e.g. lead, mercury, and organochlorides). Comprehensive policy recommendations targeting reduction of cognitive impairment in children have been proposed.

Improvements in nutrition (often involving specific micronutrients) due to public policy changes have been implicated in IQ increases in many nations (as part of the overall Flynn effect), such as efforts fighting iodine deficiency in the U.S.

== Nutrition ==
Malnutrition may occur during several periods of growth, such as pregnancy, during breastfeeding, infancy, or childhood. It may also happen due to deficiencies of different nutrients, such as micronutrients, protein or energy. This may cause different effects.

=== Timing ===
Some observers have argued that malnutrition during the first six months of life harms cognitive development much more than malnutrition later in life. However, a study from the Philippines argues that malnutrition in the second year of life may have a larger negative impact than malnutrition in the first year of life. While it is debatable whether or not as an infant or after two years is the worst time for malnourishment, the bottom line in these studies is that not having enough nutrients at a young age negatively effects learning.

=== Intrauterine growth retardation ===
Undernutrition during pregnancy, and other factors, may cause intrauterine growth retardation (IUGR), which is one cause of low birth weight. However, it has been suggested that in IUGR the brain may be selectively spared. Brain growth is usually less affected than whole body weight or length. Several studies from developed nations have found that with the exception of extreme intrauterine growth retardation also affecting brain growth, and hypoxic injury, IUGR seems to have little or no measurable effect on mental performance and behavior in adolescence or adulthood. For example, acute undernutrition for a few months during the Dutch famine of 1944 caused a decrease in mean birthweight in certain areas. This was later associated with a change in performance on IQ tests for 18–19 years old Dutch males draftees from these areas compared to control areas. The subjects were exposed to famine prenatally but not after birth. During the famine, births decreased more among those with lower socioeconomic status (SES), whereas after the famine, there was a compensatory increase in births among those with lower SES. Since SES correlates with IQ, this may have hidden an effect caused by the undernutrition.

=== Breastfeeding ===
Studies often find higher IQ in children and adults who were breastfed. It has been proposed that omega-3 fatty acids in breast milk, known to be essential constituents of brain tissues, could at least partially account for an increase in IQ.

Recently, however, the longstanding belief that breastfeeding causes an increase in the IQ of offspring was challenged in a 2006 paper published in the British Medical Journal. The results indicated that mother's IQ, not breastfeeding, explained the differences in the IQ scores of offspring measured between ages 5 and 14. The results of this meta-analysis argued that prior studies had not controlled for the mother's IQ. Since mother's IQ was predictive of whether a child was breastfed, the study concluded that "breast feeding [itself] has little or no effect on intelligence in children." Instead, it was the mother's IQ that had a significant correlation with the IQ of her offspring, whether the offspring was breastfed or was not breastfed.

One study found that breastfeeding was linked to raised IQ (as much as 7 points when not controlling for maternal IQ) if the infants had an SNP coding for a "C" rather than G base within the FADS2 gene. Those with the "G" version showed no IQ advantage, suggesting a biochemical interaction of child's genes on the effect of breastfeeding. Other studies have failed to replicate any correlation between the FADS2 gene, breastfeeding and IQ, while others show a negative effect on IQ when combining bottled feeding, and the "G" version of FADS2.

=== Infancy ===
Two studies in Chile on 18-year-old high-school graduates found that nutritional status during the first year of life affected IQ, scholastic achievement, and brain volume.

=== Micronutrients and vitamin deficiencies ===
Micronutrient deficiencies (e.g. in iodine and iron) influence the development of intelligence and remain a problem in the developing world. For example, iodine deficiency causes a fall, on average, of 12 IQ points. These deficiencies could technically show up in medical scans at various ages.

Policy recommendations to increase availability of micronutrient supplements have been made and justified in part by the potential to counteract intelligence-related developmental problems. For example, the Copenhagen consensus, states that lack of both iodine and iron has been implicated in impaired brain development, and this can affect enormous numbers of people: it is estimated that 2 billion people (one-third of the total global population) are affected by iodine deficiency, including 285 million 6- to 12-year-old children. In developing countries, it is estimated that 40% of children aged four and under have anaemia because of insufficient iron in their diets.

A joint statement on vitamin and mineral deficiencies says that the severity of such deficiencies "means the impairment of hundreds of millions of growing minds and the lowering of national IQs." Since the brain is not fully developed until age 25, this can be effecting people through their late teens.

Overall, studies investigating whether cognitive function in already iron-deficient children can be improved with iron supplements have produced mixed results, possibly because deficiency in critical growth periods may cause irreversible damage. However, several studies with better design have shown substantial benefits. One way to prevent iron deficiency is to give specific supplementation to children, for example as tablets. However, this is costly, distribution mechanisms are often ineffective, and compliance is low. Fortification of staple foods (cereals, flour, sugar, salt) to deliver micronutrients to children on a large scale is probably the most sustainable and affordable option, even though commitment from governments and the food industry is needed. Developed nations fortify several foods with various micronutrients.

Additional vitamin-mineral supplementation may have an effect also in the developed world. A study giving such supplementation to "working class", primarily Hispanic, 6–12-year-old children in the United States for 3 months found an average increase of 2 to 3 IQ points. Most of this can be explained by the very large increase of a subgroup of the children, presumably because these were not adequately nourished unlike the majority. The study suggests that parents of schoolchildren whose academic performance is substandard would be well advised to seek a nutritionally oriented physician for assessment of their children's nutritional status as a possible etiology.

More speculatively, other nutrients may prove important in the future. Vitamin B12 and folate may be important for cognitive function in old age. Fish oil supplement to pregnant and lactating mothers has been linked to increased cognitive ability in one study.

Another study found that pregnant women who consumed 340 grams of low-mercury containing fish with fatty acids per week have benefits that outweigh the risks for mercury poisoning. They were less likely to have children with low verbal IQ, motor coordination and behavioral problems. However, foods containing high amounts of mercury, such as shark, swordfish, king mackerel and tilefish, might cause mental retardation.

=== Protein and energy malnutrition ===
One study from a developing country, Guatemala, found that poor growth during infancy, rather than low birth weight, was negatively related to adolescent performance on cognitive and achievement tests. A later related very long-term study looked at the effect of giving 6–24-month-old children in Guatemala a high protein-energy drink as a dietary supplement. A significantly positive and fairly substantial effects was found on increasing the probability of attending school and of passing the first grade, increasing the grade attained by age 13, increasing completed schooling attainment, and for adults aged 25–40 increasing IQ test scores.

=== Stunting ===
31% of children under the age of 5 in the developing world are moderately (height-for-age is below minus 2 standard deviations) or severely stunted (below minus 3 standard deviations). The prevalence was even higher previously since the worldwide prevalence of stunting is declining by about half of a percentage point each year. A study on stunted children aged 9–24 months in Jamaica found that when aged 17–18 years they had significantly poorer scores than a non-stunted group on cognitive and educational tests and psychosocial functioning. Giving a nutritional supplementation (1 kg milk based formula each week) to these already stunted children had no significant effect on later scores, but psychosocial stimulation (weekly play sessions with mother and child) had a positive effect.

== Toxins ==
=== Drug use ===
Alcohol in pregnant women causes fetal alcohol syndrome, one of the leading known causes of intellectual disability in the Western world.

Current cannabis use was found to be significantly correlated in a dose-dependent manner with a decline in IQ scores, during the effect of the use. However, no such decline was seen in subjects who had formerly been heavy cannabis users and had stopped taking the drug. The authors concluded that cannabis does not have a long-term effect on intelligence. However this is contradicted by the long-term longitudinal study, carried out by Otago and Duke universities, which found that regular use of marijuana in teenage years affects IQ in adulthood even when the use stops. The drop in IQ was 8 points. Adults smoking marijuana had no lasting effect on IQ. Effects on fetal development are minimal when compared with the well-documented adverse effects of tobacco or alcohol use.

Maternal tobacco smoking during pregnancy is associated with increased activity, decreased attention, and diminished intellectual abilities. However, a recent study finds that maternal tobacco smoking has no direct causal effect on the child's IQ. Adjusting for maternal cognitive ability as measured by IQ and education eliminated the association between lower IQ and tobacco smoking. But another study instead looking at the relationship between environmental tobacco smoke exposure, measured with a blood biomarker, and cognitive abilities among U.S. children and adolescents 6–16 years of age, found an inverse association between exposure and cognitive ability among children even at extremely low levels of exposure. The study controlled for sex, race, region, poverty, parent education and marital status, ferritin, and blood lead concentration.

=== Industrial chemicals ===
Certain toxins, such as lead, mercury, toluene, and PCB are well-known causes of neuro-developmental disorders. Recognition of these risks has led to evidence-based programmes of prevention, such as elimination of lead additives in petrol. Although these prevention campaigns are highly successful, most were initiated only after substantial delays.

Policies to manage lead differ between nations, particularly between the developed and developing world. Use of leaded gasoline has been reduced or eliminated in most developed nations, and lead levels in US children have been substantially reduced by policies relating to lead reduction. Even slightly elevated lead levels around the age of 24 months are associated with intellectual and academic performance deficits at age 10 years.

Certain, at least previously, widely used organochlorides, such as dioxins, DDT, and PCB, have been associated with cognitive deficits.

A Lancet review identified 201 chemicals with the ability to cause clinical neurotoxic effects in human adults, as described in the peer-reviewed scientific literature. Most of them are commonly used. Many additional chemicals have been shown to be neurotoxic in laboratory models. The article notes that children are more vulnerable and argues that new, precautionary approaches that recognise the unique vulnerability of the developing brain are needed for testing and control of chemicals in order to avoid the previous substantial before starting restrictions on usage. An appendix listed further industrial chemicals considered to be neurotoxic.

== Healthcare during pregnancy and childbirth ==
Healthcare during pregnancy and childbirth, access to which is often governed by policy, also influences cognitive development. Preventable causes of low intelligence in children include infectious diseases such as meningitis, parasites, and cerebral malaria, prenatal drug and alcohol exposure, newborn asphyxia, low birth weight, head injuries, and endocrine disorders. A direct policy focus on determinants of childhood cognitive ability has been urged.

== Stress ==
A recent theory suggests that early childhood stress may affect the developing brain and cause negative effects. Exposure to violence in childhood has been associated with lower school grades and lower IQ in children of all races. A group of largely African American urban first-grade children and their caregivers were evaluated using self-report, interview, and standardized tests, including IQ tests. The study reported that exposure to violence and trauma-related distress in young children were associated with substantial decrements in IQ and reading achievement. Exposure to violence or trauma was correlated with a 7.5-point (SD, 0.5) decrement in IQ and a 9.8-point (SD, 0.66) decrement in reading achievement.

Violence may have a negative impact on IQ, or IQ may be protective against violence. The causal mechanism and direction of causation is unknown. Neighborhood risk has been related to lower school grades for African-American adolescents in another study from 2006.

== Infectious diseases ==
A 2010 study by Eppig, Fincher and Thornhill found a close correlation between the infectious disease burden in a country and the average IQ of its population. The researchers found that when disease was controlled for, IQ showed no correlation with other variables such as educational and nutritional levels. Since brain development requires a very high proportion of all the body's energy in newborns and children, the researchers argue that fighting infection reduces children's IQ potential. The Eppig research may help to explain the Flynn effect, the rise in intelligence noted in rich countries. They also tested other hypotheses as well, including genetic explanations, concluding that infectious disease was "the best predictor". Christopher Hassall and Thomas Sherratt repeated the analysis, and concluded "that infectious disease may be the only really important predictor of average national IQ".

In order to mitigate the effects of education on IQ, Eppig Fincher & Thornhill repeated their analysis across the United States where standardized and compulsory education exists. The correlation between infectious disease and average IQ was confirmed, and they concluded that the "evidence suggests that infectious disease is a primary cause of the global variation in human intelligence".

=== Tropical infectious diseases ===
Malaria affects 300–500 million persons each year, mostly children under age five in Africa, causing widespread anemia during a period of rapid brain development and also direct brain damage from cerebral malaria to which children are more vulnerable. A 2006 systematic review found that Plasmodium falciparum infection causes cognitive deficits in both the short- and long-term. Policies aimed at malaria reduction may have cognitive benefits. It has been suggested that the future economic and educational development of Africa critically depends on the eradication of malaria.

Roundworms infect hundreds of millions of people. There is evidence that high intensities of worms in the intestines can affect mental performance, but a systematic review in 2000 and a 2009 update found that there was insufficient evidence to show that deworming treatments improve cognitive performance or school performance in children.

HIV infection in children in sub-Saharan Africa affects their motor development, but there is insufficient evidence to show a slowing of language development.

== Effects of other diseases ==
There are numerous diseases affecting the central nervous system which can cause cognitive impairment. Many of these are associated with aging. Some common examples include Alzheimer's disease and Multi-infarct dementia. Many diseases may be neurological or psychiatric and may primarily affect the brain. Others may affect many other organs, like HIV, Hashimoto's thyroiditis causing hypothyroidism, or cancer. According to a 2015 report in The American Scholar, an assortment of neglected tropical diseases as well as some recently identified pathogens such as Pseudo-nitzschia have also been found to erode human intelligence.

Major depression, affecting about 16% of the population on at least one occasion in their lives and the leading cause of disability in North America, may give symptoms similar to dementia. Patients treated for depression score higher on IQ tests than before treatment.

=== Myopia and hyperopia ===
A 2008 literature review writes that studies in several nations have found a relationship between myopia and higher IQ and between myopia and school achievement. Several, but not all, studies have found hyperopia to be associated with lower IQ and school achievements. A common explanation for myopia is near-work. Regarding the relationship to IQ, several explanations have been proposed. One is that the myopic child is better adapted at reading, and reads and studies more, which increases intelligence. The reverse explanation is that the intelligent and studious child reads more which causes myopia. Another is that the myopic child has an advantage at IQ testing which is near work because of less eye strain. Still another explanation is that pleiotropic gene(s) affect the size of both brain and eyes simultaneously. A study of Chinese schoolchildren found that after controlling for age, gender, school, parental myopia, father's education, and books read per week, myopia was still associated with high nonverbal IQ. Nonverbal IQ was a more important explanation than books read per week.

== Other associations ==
Long working hours (55 vs. 40) was associated with decreased scores on cognitive tests in a 5-year study on midlife British civil servants.

== See also ==
- Cognitive epidemiology – Field of research
- Flynn effect – 20th-century rise in intelligence test scores
- g factor (psychometrics) – Psychometric factor also known as "general intelligence"
- Health and race – Health based on racial identity
- Race and height – Aspect of human growth
