= Verbal fluency test =

Psychological test

A verbal fluency test is a kind of psychological test in which a participant is asked to produce as many words as possible from a category in a given time (usually 60 seconds). This category can be semantic, including objects such as animals or fruits, or phonemic, including words beginning with a specified letter, such as p. The semantic fluency test is sometimes described as the category fluency test or simply as "freelisting", while letter fluency is also referred to as phonemic test fluency. The Controlled Oral Word Association Test (COWAT) is the most employed phonemic variant. Although the most common performance measure is the total number of words, other analyses such as number of repetitions, number and length of clusters of words from the same semantic or phonemic subcategory, or number of switches to other categories can be carried out.

By means of curve fitting, temporal clusters, switches, and the initial slope can be determined. Whereas the total number of words and the initial slope indicate the global (macro) structure, clusters and switches evaluate the performance's local (micro) structure.

== Clinical use ==
Verbal fluency tests have been validated as brief cognitive assessments for the detection of cognitive impairment and dementia in non-specialist clinical settings.

The National Health and Nutrition Examination Survey (NHANES) administered the Animal fluency to over three thousand participants 60 years and older in 2011–2014. Trained interviewers administered the test at the end of a face-to-face private interview in an examination center. An extensive analysis of these data has been published. Scores (median, 25th percentile, 75th percentile) declined with age: 60-69y: 19, 15, 22; 70-79y: 16.0, 12, 20; 80+y: 14, 11, 17.

Overall, alterations in verbal fluency performance have been observed in conditions such as aphasia, schizophrenia, epilepsy, Alzheimer's, or Parkinson's disease in adults, and attention deficit hyperactivity disorder (ADHD), Down syndrome, autism spectrum disorder (ASD), developmental language disorder (DLD), or dyslexia in children.

== Performance characteristics ==
Performance in verbal fluency tests show a number of consistent characteristics in both children and adults:

- A declining rate of production of new items over the duration of the task, which was long discussed as following either an exponential or a hyperbolic time course, which finally could be shown to be special cases of a unifying power function (the fused Bousfield function).
- More typical category exemplars are produced with higher frequency (i.e. by more subjects), and earlier in lists, than less typical ones.
- Items are produced in bursts of semantically-related words in the case of the semantic version and phonemic in the case of phonemic version. It has been shown that also burst of semantically-related word can be found in the case of the phonemic version.

== Neural correlates ==
Regarding the brain areas used in this task, neuropsychological investigations implicate both frontal and temporal lobe areas, the contribution of the former being more important in the phonemic variant and of the latter in the semantic variant. Accordingly, different neurological pathologies affecting these areas produce impairments (typically a reduction in the number of items generated) in one or both versions of the task. For this reason fluency tests are commonly included in clinical batteries, they have also been widely used in cognitive psychological and neuropsychological investigations.

== Exploration of semantic memory ==
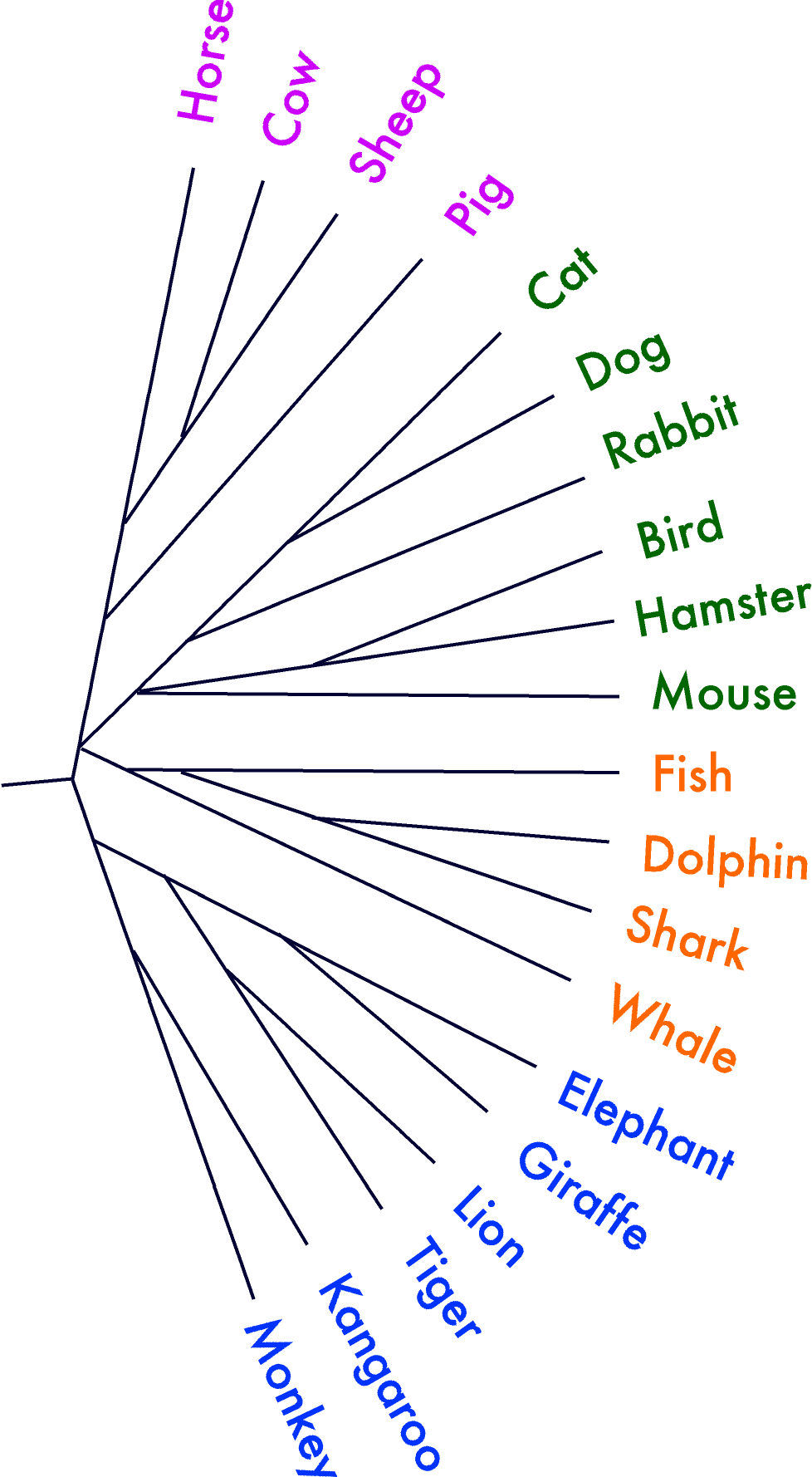
Cluster analysis of animal semantic fluency data from British schoolchildren.

Priming studies indicate that when a word or concept is activated in memory, and then spoken, it will activate other words or concepts which are associatively related or semantically similar to it. This evidence suggests that the order in which words are produced in the fluency task will provide an indirect measure of semantic distance between the items generated. Data from this semantic version of the task have therefore been the subject of many studies aimed at uncovering the structure of semantic memory, determining how this structure changes during normal development, or becomes disorganized through neurological disease or mental illness.

These studies generally make use of multiple fluency lists in order to make estimates of the semantic distance between pairs of concepts. Techniques such as multidimensional scaling and hierarchical clustering can then be used to visualize the semantic organization of the conceptual space. Such studies have generally found that semantic memory, at least as reflected by this test, has a schematic, or script-based, organization. whose core aspects may remain stable throughout life. For instance, the figure on the right shows a hierarchical clustering analysis of animal semantic fluency data from 55 British schoolchildren aged 7–8. The analysis reveals that children have schematic organization for this category according to which animals are grouped by where they are most commonly seen (on the farm, at home, in the ocean, at the zoo). Children, adults, and even zoology PhD candidates, all show this same tendency to cluster animals according to the environmental context in which they are observed.

It has been proposed that the semantic memory organization, underlying performance in the semantic fluency test, becomes disordered as the result of some forms of neuropsychological disorder such as Alzheimer's disease, Parkinson's Disease and schizophrenia; however, the evidence for this has been queried on theoretical and methodological grounds.

Curve fitting allows an analysis of the global (macro) structure as well as the temporal dynamics of clusters and switches, and a combination with semantic analysis allows the derivation of time-semantic relations. Furthermore, hypotheses about the structure of the underlying semantic network have been formulated based on the temporal analysis of verbal fluency tasks by means of curve fitting.

== See also ==
- Chicago word fluency test
