= Kohs block design test =

Psychological test

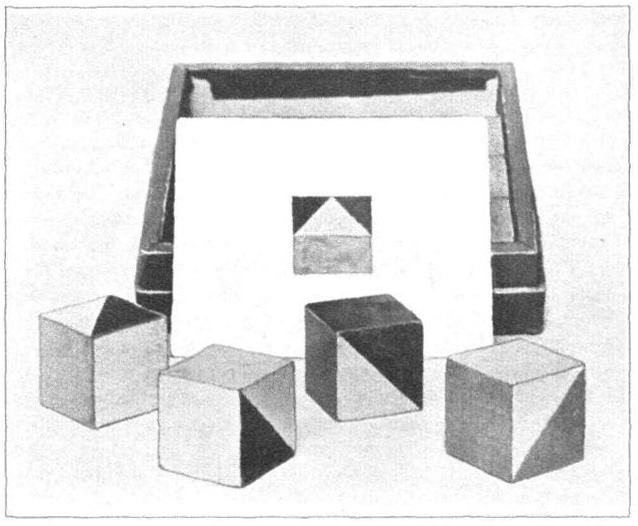
Figure 1 from The Block-Design tests by Kohs (1920) showing, in grayscale, an example of his block test.

The Kohs Block test, also known as the Kohs Block Design Test, is a performance test designed to be an IQ test. The test taker must, using 16 colored cubes, replicate the patterns displayed on a series of test cards. The design of the test was motivated by a belief that the test could easily be administered to persons with language or hearing disabilities.

== History ==
The test was developed in 1920 by psychologist Samuel C. Kohs (1890–1984), a student of Lewis Terman, building on earlier and similar designs (such as Francis N. Maxfield's Color Cube Test).

Kohs described the 1920s version of the test as a series of 17 cards which increase in complexity as the test progressed. Test takers replicated the designs with painted blocks (each side was a single color or two colors divided by a diagonal line). The initial scores were based on completion time and number of moves. Hutt amended the scoring method to only score completion time. The test was given to both children and adults.

As early as the 1930s, the Kohs Block Test was administered at the Ohio School for the Deaf, and at other schools with special needs students.

The Kohs Block Design Test has been adapted into sections in several current IQ tests. The Kohs Test continues to be used in research extensively to measure executive functioning and learning, consistent with the original design of the test. This has made the Kohs Block Test useful for assessing the effects of aging, drug use, and in brain research, among other areas. In particular, that the Kohs is a relatively non-verbal test lends it to be used effectively in assessment of those with language issues and in multicultural research settings to reduce the impact of language on assessment of functioning.

Patients with damage to the right hemisphere of the brain find successful completion of the task to be extremely difficult, so the test is often used to diagnose right hemisphere damage.

== See also ==
- Block design test
