= Jagannath Prasad Das (psychologist) =

Indian-Canadian psychologist (1931–2025)

Jagannath Prasad Das (20 January 1931 – 19 October 2025) was an Indian-Canadian educational psychologist who specialised in educational psychology, intelligence and childhood development. Among his contributions to psychology are the PASS theory of intelligence and the Das-Naglieri Cognitive Assessment System. Das was the Director of the JP Das Developmental Disabilities Centre at the University of Alberta. He formally retired in 1996 and was an Emeritus Director of the Centre on Developmental and Learning Disabilities and an Emeritus Professor of Educational Psychology at the University of Alberta. He was a member of the Royal Society of Canada, he was also inducted into the Order of Canada and has an Honorary Doctorate degree from the University of Vigo in Spain.

== Life and career ==
Das was born in Puri, a city on the coast of the Bay of Bengal in Bihar and Orissa Province, British India. He was one of six siblings, and was educated in Cuttack from grade 2 through the completion of his B.A. degree. He earned an Honors B.A. in Psychology and Philosophy from Ravenshaw College (now Ravenshaw University) in Cuttack, and an M.A. in Experimental Psychology from Patna University, India.

After two years as a lecturer in Psychology at Utkal University, in 1955 he won a Government of India scholarship to study at the Institute of Psychiatry at the University of London, supervised by Hans Eysenck. He chose for his dissertation an investigation into the relationship between hypnosis, eyelid conditioning and reactive inhibition. After earning his Ph.D. in 1957, he returned to Utkal University where he was a Lecturer in Psychology, and then a Reader in Psychology, for five years. In 1963, he was awarded a Kennedy Foundation Visiting Professorship at the Peabody College of Vanderbilt University in Nashville. After spending a year there, he moved on to UCLA, where he spent a year as a visiting associate professor in Psychology before returning to Utkal University in 1965.

Das moved to the University of Alberta in Edmonton, Alberta, Canada in 1968 as a University Research Professor at the Centre for the Study of Mental Retardation, established by Donald Ewen Cameron in 1968. He became the third Director of the Centre in 1972 and continued to work at the Centre until 1994. He formally retired in 1995, and continued at the Centre as the Emeritus Director and an Emeritus Professor, still conducting research, as well as writing books and articles. The Centre was renamed in his honour in 1997.

Das wrote more than 300 research papers and book chapters, as well as ten books. He died in Edmonton on 19 October 2025, at the age of 93.

== Order of Canada ==
Das received the Order of Canada, on 1 July 2015, "for his internationally recognized work in the field of cognitive psychology, notably in the development of a new theory of intelligence."

== Honours and awards ==
In 2015, Das was named to the Order of Canada. In addition, he has received:

- Doctorate Honoris Causa, University of Cyprus (2015)
- Honorary doctorate in psychology from the University of Vigo in Spain (2004)
- Kennedy Foundation Professorship, Peabody-Vanderbilt University, Nashville, USA (1963)
- Nuffield Fellow, University of London, UK (1972)
- Albert J. Harris Award, International Reading Association (1979)
- University of Alberta, Research Prize (1987)
- Immigration Achievement Award (1992)
- Fellow of the Royal Society of Canada (FRSC) (1999)
- Distinguished contributions to the International Advancement of Psychology. Canadian Psychology Association (2014)

In recognition of his work, Timothy Papadopoulos, Rauno Parilla and John Kirby edited Cognition, Intelligence and Achievement: A Tribute to J.P. Das, which was published in 2015 (New York: Elsevier/Academic Press, 2015. ISBN 9780124104440).

== Books ==
- Das, J. P. (1969). Verbal conditioning and behaviour. Oxford: Pergamon Press.
- Das, J. P., & Baine, D. (Eds.). (1978). Mental retardation for special educators. Springfield: Charles Thomas.
- Das, J. P., Kirby, J. R., & Jarman, R. F. (1979). Simultaneous and successive cognitive processes. New York: Academic Press.
- Friedman, M., Das, J. P., & O'Connor, N. (Eds.). (1981). Intelligence and learning. New York: Plenum Publishing Corp.
- Das, J. P., Mulcahy, R. F., & Wall, A. E. (Eds.). (1982).Theory and Research in Learning Disabilities. New York: Plenum Publishing Corp.
- Das, J. P., Naglieri, J. A., & Kirby, J. R. (1994). Assessment of Cognitive Processes. Boston, MA, USA: Allyn & Bacon. Translated into Chinese
- Das, J. P., Kar, B. C., & Parrila, R. K. (1996). Cognitive planning. New Delhi: Sage Publications.
- Das, J.P. (1997). The Working Mind. New Delhi: Sage Publications.
- Das, J. P. (2009). Reading Difficulties and Dyslexia (Revised & Enlarged edition). SAGE Publications. New Delhi; London; Thousand Oaks, USA
- Das, J. P. (2014). Consciousness Quest Where East meets West: On Mind, Meditation & Neural Correlates. Sage Publications. New Delhi; London; Thousand Oaks, USA
- Das, J.P. & Misra, S. (2014 ). Cognitive Planning and Executive Functions: Applications in Education & Management. Sage Publications. New Delhi; London; Thousand Oaks, USA
