= Samuel Kohs =

American psychologist

- Born: June 2, 1890; New York, U.S.
- Died: January 23, 1984 (aged 93); San Francisco, U.S.
- Education: City College of New York; Clark University
- Known for: Kohs block design test
- Scientific career
- Fields: Psychology
- Thesis: (1919)

Samuel Calmin Kohs (June 2, 1890 – January 23, 1984) was an American psychologist who spent his career in clinical and educational psychology. He was awarded a B.A. degree at City College of New York, an M.A. at Clark University. He developed, for his doctoral dissertation in 1919 at Stanford University, a set of small variously colored blocks (known as the Kohs blocks) that are used to form test patterns in psycho-diagnostic examination.

Kohs was an active member of the Jewish community in the U.S. He served as field secretary of the Western States division of the National Jewish Welfare Board from 1941 to 1956, as executive director of the Oakland Jewish Welfare Federation in California and of the Brooklyn Federation of Jewish Charities, and as Chairman of the Department of Social Technology at the Graduate School of Jewish Social Work in Manhattan. He had a son, Ellis. He died at age 93 in San Francisco.

== Selected works ==
- Kohs, Samuel C. (1914). "The Binet-Simon measuring scale for intelligence: An annotated bibliography. Part I". Journal of Educational Psychology. 5 (4): 215–224. doi:10.1037/h0070457.
- Kohs, S. C. (1915). "The Practicability of the Binet Scale and the Question of the Borderline Case". Psychopathic Bull. No. 2, Chicago House of Correction: 23. JSTOR 43894651.
- Kohs, Samuel Calmin (1915). A New Departure in the Treatment of Inmates of Penal Institutions. House of Correction Press.
- Kohs, S. C. (1916). "The Borderlines of Mental Deficiency". Journal of Psycho-Asthenics. 20 (3–4): 88–103.
- Kohs, S. C. (1917). "The Intelligence Quotient and Border Unity". Journal of Delinquency. 2 (l): 14–23.
- Kohs, S. C. (1920). "The Block-Design Tests". Journal of Experimental Psychology. 3 (5): 357–376. doi:10.1037/h0074466.
- Kohs, S. C. (1923). "Intelligence measurement: A psychological and statistical study based upon the block-design tests". doi:10.1037/11201-000. hdl:2027/mdp.39015001994287.
- Kohs, S. C. (1966). The Roots of Social Work. Association Press.
