= Bracken School Readiness Assessment =

Cognitive assessment for children

The Bracken School Readiness Assessment ("BSRA") is an individual concept knowledge test designed for children, pre-K through second grade.
