= John Nesselroade =

American academic (1936–2024)

John R. Nesselroade
- Born: John Richard Nesselroade; March 13, 1936
- Died: July 24, 2024 (aged 88)
- Education: Marietta College B.S. 1961, University of Illinois at Urbana–Champaign Ph.D., 1967
- Known for: Developmental psychology Quantitative psychology
- Spouse: Carolyn (Boyles) Nesselroade
- Children: Two children, two grandchildren
- Scientific career
- Fields: Psychology
- Workplaces: West Virginia University; Pennsylvania State University; University of Virginia

John Richard Nesselroade (March 13, 1936 –July 24, 2024) was an American psychologist known for his work in developmental and quantitative psychology. At the time of his death, he was the Hugh Scott Hamilton Professor of Psychology Emeritus at the University of Virginia.

== Education and Military Service ==
After graduating from Parkersburg High School (WV) in 1954, he enlisted in the United States Marines and was stationed during his service in Japan. He graduated from Marietta College in 1961 with a Bachelor of Science in mathematics. He received his M.A.(1965) and Ph.D. (1967) degrees in psychology at the University of Illinois at Urbana–Champaign, where he worked with Raymond Cattell. His dissertation was titled, A Comparison of Cross Product and Differential-R Factoring Regarding Cross Study Stability of Change Patterns.

== Career ==
Over his career, Nesselroade served on the faculty of three universities, West Virginia University (1967–1972), Pennsylvania State University (1972–1991) and University of Virginia (1991–2011). Until his retirement in 2011, he was the Hugh Scott Hamilton Professor of Psychology in the Department of Psychology at the University of Virginia. He retained this title with an emeritus designation after his retirement.

In 1970, while still at West Virginia University, he published his first article with Paul Baltes, a German developmental psychologist, who was also on the West Virginia University faculty. This was just the first article of more than a dozen with Baltes on issues of change over the lifecourse. In 1972 both Nesselroade and Baltes moved to the College of Human Development at Penn State. Until Baltes left Penn State for Germany in 1980, they jointly contributed to the literatures on the development of personality and cognitive abilities, as well as to basic methods for measuring change.

In publications with Baltes and others, Nesselroade promoted a comprehensive view of variability over people, occasions and psychological constructs. He distinguished between intraindividual variability, intraindividual change, interindividual differences and nuisance error variability. Examples of the first were states and moods that can fluctuate over short periods of time, whereas the examples of the second are longer-term development and growth that tend not to reverse. The third, interindividual differences, encompasses both differences in traits and differences in dynamic processes that regulate intraindividual variability and change. In addition to these systematic sources of variance, Nesselroade recognized that nuisance error variance needed to be recognized and minimized by careful measurement and latent variable modeling.

In contrast to traditional developmental psychology, which described groups of people at supposedly different developmental stages, Nesselroade emphasized a focus on individual persons. In collaboration with his students and colleagues, he made contributions to dynamic factor analysis of intraindividual variability, dynamic oscillatory processes and latent difference scores.

== Controversy ==
In the 1990s, Nesselroade served on a data analysis working group for the National Collegiate Athletic Association (NCAA) to study graduation rates of college athletes. Congresswoman Cardiss Collins wrote a letter to the NCAA criticizing him and two other panelists (John L. Horn and John J. McArdle) for their links to Raymond Cattell, who had been accused of having supported eugenics. Collins, as well as the Black Coaches Association, accused the panelists of sympathizing with Cattell's position. McArdle, who was the panel's principal consultant, insisted that neither he nor any other member of the working group supported Cattell's eugenic belief system.

== Awards and recognition ==
Nesselroade was elected fellow of the American Association for the Advancement of Science, the Gerontological Society of America, and the American Psychological Association (APA), as well as charter fellow of the American Psychological Society. He served as president of the APA's Division 20 in 1982 and as president of the Society of Multivariate Experimental Psychology in 1999.

He received the Distinguished Contribution Award from APA's Division 20 in 1994 and their Master Mentor Award in 2001. In 2003 he was awarded the Saul B. Sells Award for Distinguished Lifetime Achievement from the Society of Multivariate Experimental Psychology. In 2010 he presented the Paul B. Baltes Lecture at the Berlin-Brandenburg Academy of Sciences and Humanities. In 2015, he received the Samuel J. Messick Distinguished Scientific Contributions Award from Division 5 of the APA.

In 2010, Nesselroade was awarded an honorary doctorate (Dr. rer. nat. h.c.) from Humboldt University, Berlin, Germany

Nesselroade died on July 24, 2024, at the age of 88. He was described as "The Poet Laureate of Quantitative Psychology."
