= Peter Schönemann =

German-born psychometrician

- Born: Peter Hans Schönemann; July 15, 1929; Perthau, Weimar Republic
- Died: April 7, 2010 (aged 80)
- Education: Ludwig-Maximilians-Universität München; University of Göttingen; University of Illinois
- Known for: Criticism of IQ testing
- Scientific career
- Fields: Psychometrics; Statistics
- Institutions: Purdue University
- Thesis: A Solution of the Orthogonal Procrustes Problem With Applications to Orthogonal and Oblique Rotation (1964)
- Doctoral advisors: K.W. Dickman; Ledyard Tucker
- Other academic advisors: Raymond Cattell

Peter Hans Schönemann (July 15, 1929 – April 7, 2010) was a German-born psychometrician and statistical expert. He was professor emeritus in the Department of Psychological Sciences at Purdue University. His research interests included multivariate statistics, multidimensional scaling and measurement, quantitative behavior genetics, test theory and mathematical tools for social scientists. He published around 90 papers dealing mainly with the subjects of psychometrics and mathematical scaling. Schönemann's influences included Louis Guttman, Lee Cronbach, Oscar Kempthorne and Henry Kaiser.

Schönemann was a persistent critic of what he considered to be scientifically sanctioned racism in psychology. In particular, he claimed that (1) Arthur Jensen and others routinely confuse the first principal component (PC1) with g as Charles Spearman defined it, and that (2) the high IQ heritability estimates reported in the literature derive from restrictive formal models whose underlying assumptions are rarely tested and usually violated by the data.

Schönemann died on April 7, 2010.

== Education ==
- 1953–1956 Ludwig-Maximilians-Universität München (Vordiplom)
- 1956–1959 University of Göttingen (Diplom)
- 1960–1964 University of Illinois (Ph.D. in General Psychology)

== Notable work ==
Schönemann's PhD thesis "A solution of the orthogonal Procrustes problem with applications to orthogonal and oblique rotation," proposed a solution to the orthogonal Procrustes problem. Other Schönemann papers include "A generalized solution of the orthogonal Procrustes problem", "The minimum average correlation between equivalent sets of uncorrelated factors", and "Some new results on factor indeterminacy" co-authored with M.M. Wang. Schönemann wrote also numerous book chapters, including the "Psychometrics of Intelligence" chapter in Encyclopedia of Social Measurement and the "Heritability" chapter in Encyclopedia of Human Intelligence.

== g theory ==
Spearman's hypothesis asserts a correlation between the g-loadedness of IQ tests and measures of their heritability, a concept put to work in Arthur Jensen's discussion of black—white race differences from the 1980s. Schönemann regarded this work as resting on a conceptual confusion.

Schönemann argued for the non-existence of psychometric g. He wrote that there is a fundamental difference between g, first defined by Charles Spearman as a latent one-dimensional variable that accounts for all correlations among any intelligence tests, and a first principal component (PC1) of a positive correlation matrix. Spearman's tetrad difference equation states a necessary condition for such a g to exist. The important proviso for Spearman's claim that such a g qualifies as an "objective definition" of "intelligence", is that all correlation matrices of "intelligence tests" must satisfy this necessary condition, not just one or two, because they are all samples of a universe of tests that are subject to the same g. Schönemann argued that this condition is routinely violated by all correlation matrices of reasonable size, and thus, such a g does not exist.

== Twin studies ==
In a number of publications, Schönemann argued that the statistical heritability estimates used in most twin studies rest on restrictive assumptions which are usually not tested, and if they are, often are found to be violated by the data. He argued that this was true for the monozygotic twins raised apart vs. together (MZT) studies (Burt, Shields, Jinks and Fulker, Bouchard) as well as for the more widely used MZT vs dizygotic twins raised together studies. For example, the narrow heritability of responses to the question "did you have your back rubbed" work out to 0.92 heritable for males and 0.21 heritable for females. Using the statistical models published in Loehlin and Nichols (1976) the question "Did you wear sunglasses after dark?" is 130% heritable for males and 103% for females.
