= Raymond Cattell bibliography =

This is a bibliography of books by psychologist Raymond Cattell.

== 1930s ==
- Cattell, Raymond B. (1930). Cattell group intelligence scale. London: Harrap.
- Cattell, Raymond B. (1930). The subjective character of cognition. British Journal of Psychology Series, No. 5. Cambridge: Cambridge University Press.
- Cattell, Raymond B. Translation of E. Kretschmer (1931). The psychology of men of genius. London: Kegan Paul.
- Cattell, Raymond B. (1933). "The mind of primitive man (review)". Psychology and social progress: Mankind and destiny from the standpoint of a scientist. New York, NY: C.W. Daniel. ASIN B000878ET4.
- Cattell, Raymond B. (1934). Your mind and mine: An account of psychology for the inquiring layman and the prospective student. New York, NY: G.G. Harrap & co. ltd. ASIN B00086ZA4W.
- Cattell, Raymond B. (1936). A guide to mental testing for psychological clinics, schools, and industrial psychologists. New York, NY: University of London Press. ASIN B00085OKQ2.
- Cattell, Raymond B. (1937). Under sail through red Devon: Being the log of the voyage of 'Sandpiper.'. London: Alexander Maclehose. ASIN B00088U8VK.
- Cattell, Raymond B. (1937). The fight for our national intelligence. London: P.S. King & Son. ASIN B000859Y5E.
- Cattell, Raymond B. (1938). Crooked Personalities in Childhood and After: An Introduction to psychotherapy. London: Century.
- Cattell, Raymond B. (1938). Psychology and the religious quest: An account of the psychology of religion and a defence of individualism. London: T. Nelson. ASIN B00086CP0Y.

== 1940s ==
- Cattell, Raymond B. (1941). General psychology. New York, NY: Sci-art publishers. ASIN B0007DXYRQ.
- Cattell, Raymond B. (1949). Test of "g": Culture fair. Savoy, IL: Institute for Personality and Ability Testing. ASIN B0007GWGM2.

== 1950s ==
- Cattell, Raymond B. (1950). Personality: A systematic theoretical and factual study (McGraw-Hill publications in psychology). New York, NY: McGraw-Hill. ASIN B0006D6N7A.
- Cattell, Raymond B. (1950). Culture Fair Intelligence Test: A measure of "g". Savoy, IL: Institute for Personality and Ability Testing. ASIN B0007HC45U.
- Cattell, Raymond B. (1951). Distribution of psychosis, neurosis and neurotic conditions produced by war. New York, NY: Dept. of Defense, Research and Development Board. ASIN B0007HKFT2.
- Cattell, Raymond B. (1951). The distribution of national resources of intelligence and special aptitudes. New York, NY: Dept. of Defense, Research and Development Board. ASIN B0007HKFTC.
- Cattell, Raymond B. (1951). The distribution of civilian occupations and their relation to mobilization. New York, NY: Dept. of Defense, Research and Development Board. ASIN B0007HKFSS.
- Cattell, Raymond B. Research on the psychodynamics of groups under control condition: Principally directed to discover objectively measurable independent dimensions of group morale and performance. ASIN B0007JHGI8.
- Cattell, Raymond B. (1952). Cattell group and individual intelligence tests: With an introductory note. G.G. Harrap. ASIN B0007K1F7A.
- Cattell, Raymond B. A universal index for psychological factors (Illinois. University. Laboratory of Personality Assessment and Group Behavior. Advance publication). ASIN B0007HC2VQ.
- Cattell, Raymond B. (1953). Handbook for the junior personality quiz: "the J.P.Q.": a questionnaire measuring 12 personality factors in 10-16 year old children. ASIN B0007GTSJ6.
- Cattell, Raymond B. (1954). C.P.F. [contact personality factor test]. Savoy, IL: Institute for Personality and Ability Testing. ASIN B0007FNJ8S.
- Cattell, Raymond B. (1955). Handbook for the Objective-Analytic Personality Test batteries: (including Adult and Child O-A Batteries). Savoy, IL: Institute for Personality and Ability Testing. ASIN B0007GR7PS.
- Cattell, Raymond B. (1957). Personality and motivation structure and measurement. World Book Co. ASIN B0007DER4U.
- Cattell, Raymond B. (1957). Handbook for the IPAT anxiety scale questionnaire (self analysis form): Brief, verbal questionnaire, Q-form, as distinct from objective T-battery. Savoy, IL: Institute for Personality and Ability Testing. ASIN B0007GTSW8.
- Cattell, Raymond B. (1957). Culture fair intelligence test, a measure of "g": Scale 3, forms A and B (high school pupils and adults of superior intelligence). Savoy, IL: Institute for Personality and Ability Testing. ASIN B0007FNIY8.
- Cattell, Raymond B. (1958). The nature of anxiety: a review of thirteen multivariate analyses comprising 814 variables (Psychological Reports). ASIN B0007GWFRS.
- Cattell, Raymond B. (1958). High school personality questionnaire: The HSPQ test. Savoy, IL: Institute for Personality and Ability Testing. ASIN B0007GTSLY.

== 1960s ==
- Cattell, Raymond B. (1960). Objective-analytic (O-A) anxiety battery. Savoy, IL: Institute for Personality and Ability Testing. ASIN B0007FEWZ2.
- Cattell, Raymond B. (1960). Measuring intelligence with the Culture Fair Tests. Savoy, IL: Institute for Personality and Ability Testing. ASIN B00072C26G.
- Cattell, Raymond B. (1960). The dimensions of groups and their relations to the behavior of members: A large-scale experimental study and a theoretical model. Savoy, IL: Institute for Personality and Ability Testing. ASIN B0007F0KYO.
- Cattell, Raymond B. (1962). Recent advances in the measurement of anxiety, neuroticism, and the psychotic syndromes (Annals of the New York Academy of Sciences). New York: The Academy. ASIN B0007GX8QK.
- Cattell, Raymond B. (1962). Handbook for the sixteen personality factor questionnaire, "The 16 P.F. Test" forms A, B, and C. Savoy, IL: Institute for Personality and Ability Testing. ASIN B0007FLPUC.
- Cattell, Raymond B. (1962). Handbook for the Jr.-Sr. high school personality questionnaire: "the HSPQ". Savoy, IL: Institute for Personality and Ability Testing. ASIN B0007GTSL4.
- Cattell, Raymond B. (1963). The nature and measurement of anxiety. New York: W.H. Freeman. ASIN B0007G1MZO.
- Cattell, Raymond B. (1963). Handbook for the IPAT Anxiety Scale questionnaire (self analysis form): A brief, valid, and non-stressful questionnaire scale, measuring anxiety level ... young adults down to 14 or 15 years of age. Savoy, IL: Institute for Personality and Ability Testing. ASIN B0007EFWNO.
- Cattell, Raymond B. (1965). The general relations of changes in personality and interest to changes in school performance. Champaign, IL: Laboratory of Personality Assessment and Group Behavior; Dept. of Psychology, University of Illinois. ASIN B0007FE2T8.
- Cattell, Raymond B. (1965). The Scientific Analysis of Personality. Harmondsworth, England: Penguin Books. ASIN B0007FE2T8.
- Cattell, R. B., & Butcher, H. J. (1968). The prediction of achievement and creativity. Indianapolis: Bobbs-Merrill.

== 1970s ==
- Cattell, R. B. (1973). Personality and mood by questionnaire. San Francisco: Jossey-Bass.
- Cattell, R. B., & Child, D. (1975). Motivation and dynamic structure. London: Holt, Rinehart & Winston.
- Cattell, R. B., & Kline, P. (1977). The scientific analysis of personality and motivation. New York: Academic Press.
- Cattell, R. B. (1978). The scientific use of factor analysis in behavioral and life sciences. New York: Plenum.
- Cattell, R. B., & Dreger, R. M. (Eds.). (1978). Handbook of modern personality theory. New York: Wiley.
- Cattell, R. B. (1979). Personality and Learning Theory: Volume 1, The Structure of Personality in Its Environment. New York: Springer.

== 1980s ==
- Cattell, R. B. (1980). Personality and Learning Theory: Volume 2, A Systems Theory of Maturation and Structured Learning. New York: Springer.
- Cattell, R. B. (1983). Structured personality-learning theory: a wholistic multivariate research approach. New York: Praeger.
- Cattell, R. B., & Johnson, R. C. (Eds.). (1986). Functional psychological testing: Principles and instruments. New York: Brunner-Mazel.
- Cattell, R. B. (1987). Psychotherapy by structured learning theory. New York: Springer.
- Cattell, R. B. (1987). Intelligence: Its Structure, Growth and Action. New York: North-Holland.
- Cattell, R. B. (1987). Beyondism: Religion from Science. New York: Praeger.
- Cattell, R. B., & Nesselroade, J. R. (Eds.) (1988). Handbook of multivariate experimental psychology (2nd rev. ed.). New York: Plenum

== Sources ==
For a book and article bibliography, see this page.
