= Validity of intelligence =

Validity of intelligence refers to the extent of the practical validity of g, or general intelligence, as a predictor of educational, economic, and social outcomes is the subject of ongoing debate. Some researchers have argued that it is more far-ranging and universal than any other known psychological variable, and that the validity of g increases as the complexity of the measured task increases. Others have argued that tests of specific abilities outperform g factor in analyses fitted to certain real-world situations.

A test's practical validity is measured by its correlation with performance on some criterion external to the test, such as college grade-point average, or a rating of job performance. The correlation between test scores and a measure of some criterion is called the validity coefficient. One way to interpret a validity coefficient is to square it to obtain the variance accounted by the test. For example, a validity coefficient of .30 corresponds to 9 percent of variance explained. This approach has, however, been criticized as misleading and uninformative, and several alternatives have been proposed. One arguably more interpretable approach is to look at the percentage of test takers in each test score quintile who meet some agreed-upon standard of success. For example, if the correlation between test scores and performance is .30, the expectation is that 67 percent of those in the top quintile will be above-average performers, compared to 33 percent of those in the bottom quintile.

== Academic achievement ==
The predictive validity of g is most conspicuous in the domain of scholastic performance. This is apparently because g is closely linked to the ability to learn novel material and understand concepts and meanings.

In elementary school, the correlation between IQ and grades and achievement scores is between .60 and .70. At more advanced educational levels, more students from the lower end of the IQ distribution drop out, which restricts the range of IQs and results in lower validity coefficients. In high school, college, and graduate school the validity coefficients are .50–.60, .40–.50, and .30–.40, respectively. The g loadings of IQ scores are high, but it is possible that some of the validity of IQ in predicting scholastic achievement is attributable to factors measured by IQ independent of g. According to research by Robert L. Thorndike, 80 to 90 percent of the predictable variance in scholastic performance is due to g, with the rest attributed to non-g factors measured by IQ and other tests.

Achievement test scores are more highly correlated with IQ than school grades. This may be because grades are more influenced by the teacher's idiosyncratic perceptions of the student. In a longitudinal English study, g scores measured at age 11 correlated with all the 25 subject tests of the national GCSE examination taken at age 16. The correlations ranged from .77 for the mathematics test to .42 for the art test. The correlation between g and a general educational factor computed from the GCSE tests was .81.

Research suggests that the SAT, widely used in college admissions, is primarily a measure of g. A correlation of .82 has been found between g scores computed from an IQ test battery and SAT scores. In a study of 165,000 students at 41 U.S. colleges, SAT scores were found to be correlated at .47 with first-year college grade-point average after correcting for range restriction in SAT scores (the correlation rises to .55 when course difficulty is held constant, i.e., if all students attended the same set of classes).

== Job attainment ==
There is a high correlation of .90 to .95 between the prestige rankings of occupations, as rated by the general population, and the average general intelligence scores of people employed in each occupation. At the level of individual employees, the association between job prestige and g is lower – one large U.S. study reported a correlation of .65 (.72 corrected for attenuation). Mean level of g thus increases with perceived job prestige. It has also been found that the dispersion of general intelligence scores is smaller in more prestigious occupations than in lower level occupations, suggesting that higher level occupations have minimum g requirements.

== Job performance ==
Research indicates that tests of g are the best single predictors of job performance, with an average validity coefficient of .55 across several meta-analyses of studies based on supervisor ratings and job samples. The average meta-analytic validity coefficient for performance in job training is .63. The validity of g in the highest complexity jobs (professional, scientific, and upper management jobs) has been found to be greater than in the lowest complexity jobs, but g has predictive validity even for the simplest jobs. Research also shows that specific aptitude tests tailored for each job provide little or no increase in predictive validity over tests of general intelligence. It is believed that g affects job performance mainly by facilitating the acquisition of job-related knowledge. The predictive validity of g is greater than that of work experience, and increased experience on the job does not decrease the validity of g.

In a 2011 meta-analysis, researchers found that general cognitive ability (GCA) predicted job performance better than personality (Five factor model) and three streams of emotional intelligence. They examined the relative importance of these constructs on predicting job performance and found that cognitive ability explained most of the variance in job performance. Other studies suggested that GCA and emotional intelligence have a linear independent and complementary contribution to job performance. Côté and Miners (2015) found that these constructs are interrelated when assessing their relationship with two aspects of job performance: organisational citizenship behaviour (OCB) and task performance. Emotional intelligence is a better predictor of task performance and OCB when GCA is low and vice versa. For instance, an employee with low GCA will compensate his/her task performance and OCB, if emotional intelligence is high.

Although these compensatory effects favour emotional intelligence, GCA still remains as the best predictor of job performance. Several researchers have studied the correlation between GCA and job performance among different job positions. For instance, Ghiselli (1973) found that salespersons had a higher correlation than sales clerk. The former obtained a correlation of 0.61 for GCA, 0.40 for perceptual ability and 0.29 for psychomotor abilities; whereas sales clerk obtained a correlation of 0.27 for GCA, 0.22 for perceptual ability and 0.17 for psychomotor abilities. Other studies compared GCA – job performance correlation between jobs of different complexity. Hunter and Hunter (1984) developed a meta-analysis with over 400 studies and found that this correlation was higher for jobs of high complexity (0.57). Followed by jobs of medium complexity (0.51) and low complexity (0.38).

Job performance is measured by objective rating performance and subjective ratings. Although the former is better than subjective ratings, most of studies in job performance and GCA have been based on supervisor performance ratings. This rating criterion is considered problematic and unreliable, mainly because of its difficulty to define what is a good and bad performance. Rating of supervisors tends to be subjective and inconsistent among employees. Additionally, supervisor rating of job performance is influenced by different factors, such as halo effect, facial attractiveness, racial or ethnic bias, and height of employees. However, Vinchur, Schippmann, Switzer and Roth (1998) found in their study with sales employees that objective sales performance had a correlation of 0.04 with GCA, while supervisor performance rating got a correlation of 0.40. These findings were surprising, considering that the main criterion for assessing these employees would be the objective sales.

In understanding how GCA is associated job performance, several researchers concluded that GCA affects acquisition of job knowledge, which in turn improves job performance. In other words, people high in GCA are capable to learn faster and acquire more job knowledge easily, which allow them to perform better. Conversely, lack of ability to acquire job knowledge will directly affect job performance. This is due to low levels of GCA. Also, GCA has a direct effect on job performance. In a daily basis, employees are exposed constantly to challenges and problem solving tasks, which success depends solely on their GCA. These findings are discouraging for governmental entities in charge of protecting rights of workers. Because of the high correlation of GCA on job performance, companies are hiring employees based on GCA tests scores. Inevitably, this practice is denying the opportunity to work to many people with low GCA. Previous researchers have found significant differences in GCA between race / ethnicity groups. For instance, there is a debate whether studies were biased against Afro-Americans, who scored significantly lower than white Americans in GCA tests. However, findings on GCA-job performance correlation must be taken carefully. Some researchers have warned the existence of statistical artifacts related to measures of job performance and GCA test scores. For example, Viswesvaran, Ones and Schmidt (1996) argued that is quite impossible to obtain perfect measures of job performance without incurring in any methodological error. Moreover, studies on GCA and job performance are always susceptible to range restriction, because data is gathered mostly from current employees, neglecting those that were not hired. Hence, sample comes from employees who successfully passed hiring process, including measures of GCA.

== Income ==
The correlation between income and g, as measured by IQ scores, averages about .40 across studies. The correlation is higher at higher levels of education and it increases with age, stabilizing when people reach their highest career potential in middle age. Even when education, occupation and socioeconomic background are held constant, the correlation does not vanish.

== Other correlates ==
The g factor is reflected in many social outcomes. Many social behavior problems, such as dropping out of school, chronic welfare dependency, accident proneness, and crime, are negatively correlated with g independent of social class of origin. Health and mortality outcomes are also linked to g, with higher childhood test scores predicting better health and mortality outcomes in adulthood (see Cognitive epidemiology).
