= Cattell Culture Fair Intelligence Test =

Test attempting to measure innate ability

- Purpose: measure cognitive abilities devoid of sociocultural influence

The Culture Fair Intelligence Test (CFIT) was created by Raymond Cattell in 1949 as an attempt to measure cognitive abilities devoid of sociocultural and environmental influences. Scholars have subsequently concluded that the attempt to construct measures of cognitive abilities devoid of the influences of experiential and cultural conditioning is a challenging one. Cattell proposed that general intelligence (g) comprises both fluid intelligence (Gf) and crystallized intelligence (Gc). Whereas Gf is biologically and constitutionally based, Gc is the actual level of a person's cognitive functioning, based on the augmentation of Gf through sociocultural and experiential learning (including formal schooling).

Cattell built into the CFIT a standard deviation of 24 IQ points.

== Cultural and age differences ==
Crystallized intelligence (Gc) refers to that aspect of cognition in which initial intelligent judgments have become crystallized as habits. Fluid intelligence (Gf) is in several ways more fundamental and is particularly evident in tests requiring responses to novel situations. Before biological maturity individual differences between Gf and Gc will be mainly a function of differences in cultural opportunity and interest. Among adults, however, these discrepancies will also reflect differences with increasing age because the gap between Gc and Gf will tend to increase with experience which raises Gc, whereas Gf gradually declines as a result of declining brain function.

== Question items ==
The Culture Fair tests consist of three scales with non-verbal visual puzzles. Scale I includes eight subtests of mazes, copying symbols, identifying similar drawings and other non-verbal tasks. Both Scales II and III consist of four subtests that include completing a sequence of drawings, a classification subtest where respondents pick a drawing that is different from other drawings, a matrix subtest that involves completing a matrix of patterns, and a conditions subtest which involves which, out of several geometric designs, fulfills a specific given condition.

== Modern use ==
The Cattell Culture Fair Intelligence Test (like the Raven's Progressive Matrices) is not completely free from the influence of culture and learning. Some high-IQ societies, such as The Triple Nine Society, accept high scores on the CFIT-III as one of a variety of old and new tests for admission to the society. A combined minimum raw score of 85 on Forms A and B is required for admission. The tests are used by many including Mensa and Intertel, which offer a place in their society to anyone scoring in the top 2% and in the top 1% IQ scores respectively.

=== Validity ===
==== Direct concept validity ====
Direct concept validity (sometimes called construct validity) refers to the degree to which a certain scale correlates with the concept or construct (i.e., source trait) which it purports to measure. Concept validity is thus measured by correlating the scale with the pure factor and this can only be carried out by performing a methodologically sound factor analysis. The relatively high loading of the Culture Fair Intelligence Test on the fluid intelligence factor indicates that the CFIT does, in fact, have a reasonably high direct concept validity with respect to the concept of fluid intelligence. The Culture Fair Intelligence Test was found to load more highly on a "General Intelligence" factor than on an "Achievement" factor, which is consistent with the concept that the CFIT is a measure of "fluid" rather than "crystallized" intelligence.

==== Convergent validity ====
Convergent Validity is the extent to which the Culture Fair Intelligence Test correlates with other tests of intelligence, achievement, and aptitude. The intercorrelations between the Culture Fair Intelligence Test and some other intelligence tests have been reported, as shown in the Table below.

Correlations of the CFIT with other IQ tests
Mean I	Test		(1)	(2)	(3)	(4)	(5)	(6)
96	Culture Fair Intelligence Test IQ	(1)	1.00	.49	.69	.62	.63	.72
87	Otis Beta Test IQ	(2)		1.00	.80	.69	.45	.66
90	Pintner Test IQ	(3)			1.00	.81	.55	.79
92	WISC Verbal IQ	(4)				1.00	.55	.79
93	WISC Performance IQ	(5)					1.00	.79
92	WISC Full Scale IQ	(6)						1.00

== See also ==
The most widely used individual tests of cognitive abilities, such as the fifth editions of the Wechsler Adult Intelligence Scale and the Stanford–Binet Intelligence Scale, report cognitive ability scores as "deviation IQs" with 15 IQ points corresponding to one standard deviation above or below the mean.

- Stanford–Binet Intelligence Scales
- Wechsler Adult Intelligence Scale

== Bibliography ==
- Cattell, R. B. La theorie de l'intelligence fluide et cristallisee sa relation avec les tests "culture fair" et sa verification chez les enfants de 9 a 12 ans. Revue de Psychologie Appliquee, 1967, 17, 3, 135154.
- Cattell, R. B. La teoria dell' intelligenza fluida e cristallizzata: Sua relazione con i tests "culture fair" e sue verifica in bambini dai 9 ai 12 anni. (The theory of fluid and crystallized intelligence: Its relationship to culture free tests and its verification in 9 to 12-year-old children.) Bollettino di Psicologia Applicata, 1968, 8890, 322.
- Cattell, R. B. Abilities: Their structure growth and action. Boston, MA: Houghton Mifflin, 1971, p. 79.
- Cattell, R. B., Barton, K., & Dielman, T. E. Prediction of school achievement from motivation, personality and ability measures. Psychological Reports, 1972, 3O, 35-43.
- Cattell, R. B., & Butcher, J. The Prediction of Achievement and Creativity. Indianapolis, IN: Bobbs Merrill, 1968, pp. 165–166.
