= N-back =

Continuous performance task

The n-back task is a continuous performance task that is commonly used as an assessment in psychology and cognitive neuroscience to measure a part of working memory and working memory capacity. The n-back was introduced by Wayne Kirchner in 1958. N-Back games are purported to be a training method to improve working memory and working memory capacity and also increase fluid intelligence. While some scientific studies have shown such a connection, others have not.

== The task ==
The subject is presented with a sequence of stimuli, and the task consists of indicating when the current stimulus matches the one from n steps earlier in the sequence. The load factor n can be adjusted to make the task more or less difficult.

To clarify, the visual n-back test is similar to the classic memory game of Concentration. However, instead of different items that are in a fixed location on the game board, there is only one item, that appears in different positions on the game board during each turn. "1-back" means that you have to remember the position of the item, one turn back. "2-back" means that you have to remember the position of the item two turns back, and so on.

For example, an auditory three-back test could consist of the experimenter reading the following list of letters to the test subject:

T L H C H O C Q L C K L H C Q T R R K C H R

The subject is supposed to indicate when the letters marked in bold are read, because those correspond to the letters that were read three steps earlier.

The n-back task captures the active part of working memory. When n equals 2 or more, it is not enough to simply keep a representation of recently presented items in mind; the working memory buffer also needs to be updated continuously to keep track of what the current stimulus must be compared to. To accomplish this task, the subject needs to both maintain and manipulate information in working memory.

=== Dual n-back ===
The dual-task n-back task is a variation that was proposed by Susanne Jaeggi et al. in 2003. In the dual-task paradigm, two independent sequences are presented simultaneously, typically using different modalities of stimuli, such as one auditory and one visual.

Several smart phone apps and online implementations of the dual n-back task exist.

== Applications ==
=== Assessment ===
The n-back task was developed by Wayne Kirchner for his research into short-term memory; he used it to assess age differences in memory tasks of "rapidly changing information".

==== Construct validity ====
There is some question about the construct validity of the n-back task. While the task has strong face validity and is now in widespread use as a measure of working memory in clinical and experimental settings, there are few studies which explore the convergent validity of the n-back task with other measures of working memory. Those studies have largely revealed weak or modest correlations between individuals' performance on the n-back task and performance on other standard, accepted assessments of working memory.

There are two main hypotheses for this weak correlation between the n-back task and other working memory assessments. One proposal is that the n-back task assesses different "sub-components" of working memory than do other assessments. A more critical explanation is that rather than primarily assessing working memory, performance on the n-back task depends on "familiarity- and recognition-based discrimination processes," whereas valid assessments of working memory demand "active recall." Whatever the cause of the performance differences between the n-back and other assessments of working memory, some researchers stress the need for further exploration of the construct validity of the n-back task.

Performance on the n-back task seems to be more closely correlated with performance on measures of fluid intelligence than it is with performance on other measures of working memory (which is also correlated with performance on measures of fluid intelligence). In the same vein, training on the n-back task appears to improve performance on subsequent fluid intelligence assessments, especially when the training is at a higher n-value.

=== Treatment ===
A 2008 research paper claimed that practicing a dual n-back task can increase fluid intelligence (Gf), as measured in several different standard tests. This finding received some attention from popular media, including an article in Wired. However, a subsequent criticism of the paper's methodology questioned the experiment's validity and took issue with the lack of uniformity in the tests used to evaluate the control and test groups. For example, the progressive nature of Raven's Advanced Progressive Matrices (APM) test may have been compromised by modifications of time restrictions (i.e., 10 minutes were allowed to complete a normally 45-minute test). The authors of the original paper later addressed this criticism by citing research indicating that scores in timed administrations of the APM are predictive of scores in untimed administrations.

The 2008 study was replicated in 2010 with results indicating that practicing single n-back may be almost equal to dual n-back in increasing the score on tests measuring Gf (fluid intelligence). The single n-back test used was the visual test, leaving out the audio test. In 2011, the same authors showed long-lasting transfer effect in some conditions.

Two studies published in 2012 failed to reproduce the effect of dual n-back training on fluid intelligence. These studies found that the effects of training did not transfer to any other cognitive ability tests. In 2014, a meta-analysis of twenty studies showed that n-back training has small but significant effect on Gf and improve it on average for an equivalent of 3–4 points of IQ. In January 2015, this meta-analysis was the subject of a critical review due to small-study effects.

A more recent and extended meta-analysis in January 2017 also found that n-back training produces a medium improvement in unrelated n-back training tasks, but a small improvement in unrelated working memory (WM) tasks:

The present meta-analysis on the efficacy of n-back training shows medium transfer effects to untrained versions of the trained n-back tasks and small transfer effects to other WM tasks, cognitive control, and Gf [fluid intelligence]. Our results suggest that previous meta-analyses investigating the effects of WM training have overestimated the transfer effects to WM by including untrained variants of the training tasks in their WM transfer domain. Consequently, transfer of n-back training is more task-specific than has previously been suggested.

The question of whether n-back training produces real-world improvements to working memory remains controversial. New research seems to show transfer effects to other cognitive tasks.

==== Use in tutoring and rehabilitation ====
The n-back is now in use outside experimental, clinical, and medical settings. Tutoring companies utilize versions of the task (in conjunction with other cognitive tasks) to allegedly improve the fluid intelligence of their clients. Tutoring companies and psychologists also utilize the task to improve the focus of individuals with ADHD and to rehabilitate sufferers of traumatic brain injury; experiments have found evidence that practice with the task helps these individuals focus for up to eight months following training. However, much debate remains about whether training on the n-back and similar tasks can improve performance in the long run or whether the effects of training are transient, and if the effects of training n-back generalize to general cognitive processing, for instance, to fluid intelligence. Despite the claims of commercial providers, there are some researchers who question whether the results of memory training are transferable. Researchers from the University of Oslo published results of the meta-analytical review analyzing various studies on memory training techniques (including n-back) and contentiously concluded that "training programs give only near-transfer effects, and there is no convincing evidence that even such near-transfer effects are durable."

== Neurobiology of n-back task ==
Meta-analysis of 24 n-back neuroimaging studies have shown that during this task the following brain regions are consistently activated: lateral premotor cortex; dorsal cingulate and medial premotor cortex; dorsolateral and ventrolateral prefrontal cortex; frontal poles; and medial and lateral posterior parietal cortex.

== See also ==
- Evidence-based education
