= Fluid and crystallized intelligence =

Factors of general intelligence

The concepts of fluid intelligence (g_{f}) and crystallized intelligence (g_{c}) were introduced in 1943 by psychologist Raymond Cattell. According to Cattell's psychometrically-based theory, general intelligence (g) is subdivided into g_{f} and g_{c}. Fluid intelligence is the ability to solve novel reasoning problems. It is correlated with a number of important skills such as comprehension, problem-solving, and learning. Crystallized intelligence, on the other hand, involves the ability to deduce secondary relational abstractions by applying previously learned primary relational abstractions.

== History ==
Fluid and crystallized intelligence are constructs originally conceptualized by Raymond Cattell. The concepts of fluid and crystallized intelligence were further developed by Cattell and his former student John L. Horn. Most of the intelligence testing had mainly been focused on children and young adults. Cattell and Horn wanted to see how intelligence changed and developed when aging took place on an individual. They realized that while some memories and concepts remained, others diminished. Thus, there was a need to delineate two types of intelligence.

== Fluid versus crystallized intelligence ==
Fluid intelligence (g_{f}) involved basic processes of reasoning and other mental activities that depend only minimally on prior learning (such as formal and informal education) and acculturation. Horn notes that it is formless and can "flow into" a wide variety of cognitive activities. Tasks measuring fluid reasoning require the ability to solve abstract reasoning problems, for example figure classifications, figural analyses, number and letter series, matrices, and paired associates.

Crystallized intelligence (g_{c}) is the application of learned procedures and knowledge, and depends heavily on experience and acculturation. Horn notes that crystallized ability is a "precipitate out of experience," resulting from the prior application of fluid ability that has been combined with the intelligence of culture. Examples of tasks that measure crystallized intelligence are vocabulary, general information, abstract word analogies, and the mechanics of language.

=== Example application of fluid and crystallized abilities to problem-solving ===
Horn provided the following example of crystallized and fluid approaches to solving a problem. Here is the problem he described:

"There are 100 patients in a hospital. Some (an even number) are one-legged but wearing shoes. One-half of the remainder are barefooted. How many shoes are being worn?"

The crystallized approach to solving the problem would involve the application of high school-level algebra. Algebra is an acculturational product.

$x + 1/2*(100-x)*2$ is the number of shoes worn, where x equals the number of one-legged patients. $100 - x$ equals the number of two-legged patients. The solution boils down to 100 shoes.

In contrast to the crystallized approach to solving the problem, Horn provided a made-up example of a fluid approach to solving the problem, an approach that does not depend on the learning of high school-level algebra. In his made-up example, Horn described a boy who is too young to attend secondary school but could solve the problem through the application of fluid ability: "He may reason that if half the two-legged people are without shoes, and all the rest (an even number) are one-legged, then the shoes must average one per person, and the answer is 100."

== Relationship to Piaget's theory of cognitive development ==
Researchers have linked the theory of fluid and crystallized abilities to Piaget's theory of cognitive development. Fluid ability and Piaget's operative intelligence both concern logical thinking and the "eduction of relations" (an expression Cattell used to refer to the inferring of relationships). Crystallized ability and Piaget's treatment of everyday learning reflects the impress of experience. Like fluid ability's relation to crystallized intelligence, Piaget's operativity is considered to be prior to, and ultimately provides the foundation for, everyday learning.

== Measurement of fluid intelligence ==
Various measures have been thought to assess fluid intelligence.

=== Raven's Progressive Matrices ===
The Raven's Progressive Matrices (RPM) is one of the most commonly used measures of fluid ability. It is a non-verbal multiple-choice test. Participants have to complete a series of drawings by identifying relevant features based on the spatial organization of an array of objects and choosing one object that matches one or more of the identified features. This task assesses the ability to consider one or more relationships between mental representations or relational reasoning. Propositional analogies and semantic decision tasks are also used to assess relational reasoning.

=== Woodcock–Johnson Tests of Cognitive Abilities, Third Edition ===
In the Woodcock–Johnson Tests of Cognitive Abilities, Third Edition (WJ-III), g_{f} is assessed by two tests: Concept Formation and Analysis Synthesis. Concept Formation tasks require the individual to use categorical thinking; Analysis Synthesis tasks require general sequential reasoning.

==== Concept Formation ====
Individuals have to apply concepts by inferring the underlying "rules" for solving visual puzzles that are presented with increasing levels of difficulty. As the level of difficulty increases, individuals have to identify a key difference (or the "rule") for solving puzzles involving one-to-one comparisons. For more difficult items, individuals need to understand the concept of "and" (e.g., a solution must have some of this and some of that) and the concept of "or" (e.g., to be inside a box, the item must be either this or that). The most difficult items require fluid transformations and cognitive shifting between the various types of concept puzzles that the examinee had worked with previously.

==== Analysis–Synthesis ====
In the Analysis–Synthesis test, the individual has to learn and orally state the solutions to incomplete logic puzzles that mimic a miniature mathematics system. The test also contains some of the features involved in using symbolic formulations in other fields such as chemistry and logic. The individual has presented a set of logic rules, a "key" that is used to solve the puzzles. The individual has to determine the missing colors within each of the puzzles using the key. Complex items presented puzzles that require two or more sequential mental manipulations of the key to deriving a final solution. Increasingly difficult items involve a mix of puzzles that requires fluid shifts in deduction, logic, and inference.

=== Wechsler Intelligence Scales for Children, Fourth Edition ===
The Wechsler Intelligence Scales for Children, Fourth Edition (WISC-IV) is used to have an overall measure in cognitive ability with five primary indexing scores. In the WISC-IV, the Perceptual Reasoning Index contains two subtests that assess g_{f}: Matrix Reasoning, which involves induction and deduction, and Picture Concepts, which involves induction.

==== Picture Concepts ====
In the Picture Concepts task, children are presented with a series of pictures on two or three rows and asked which pictures (one from each row) belong together based on some common characteristic. This task assesses the child's ability to discover the underlying characteristic (e.g., rule, concept, trend, class membership) that governs a set of materials.

==== Matrix Reasoning ====
Matrix Reasoning also assesses this ability as well as the ability to start with stated rules, premises, or conditions and to engage in one or more steps to reach a solution to a novel problem (deduction). In the Matrix Reasoning test, children have presented with a series or sequence of pictures with one picture missing. Their task requires the child to choose the picture that fits the series or sequence from an array of five options. Since Matrix Reasoning and Picture Concepts involve the use of visual stimuli and do not require expressive language, they have been considered to be non-verbal tests of g_{f}.

=== In the workplace ===
Within the corporate environment, fluid intelligence is a predictor of a person's capacity to work well in environments characterised by complexity, uncertainty, and ambiguity. The Cognitive Process Profile (CPP) measures a person's fluid intelligence and cognitive processes. It maps these against suitable work environments according to Elliott Jaques's Stratified Systems Theory. Fe et al. (2022) show that fluid intelligence measured in childhood predicts labor market earnings.

=== Factors related to measuring intelligence ===
Some authors have suggested that unless an individual is truly interested in a problem presented on an IQ test, the cognitive work required to solve the problem may not be performed owing to a lack of interest. These authors have contended that a low score on tests that are intended to measure fluid intelligence may reflect more of a lack of interest in the tasks than an inability to complete the tasks successfully.

== Development across life span ==
Fluid intelligence peaks at around age 27 and then gradually declines. This decline may be related to local atrophy of the brain in the right cerebellum, a lack of practice, or the result of age-related changes in the brain.

Crystallized intelligence typically increases gradually, stays relatively stable across most of adulthood, and then begins to decline after age 65. The exact peak age of cognitive skills remains elusive.

== Fluid intelligence and working memory ==
Working memory capacity is closely related to fluid intelligence, and has been proposed to account for individual differences in g_{f}. The linking of working memory and g_{f} has been suggested that it could help resolve mysteries that have puzzled researchers concerning the two concepts.

=== Neuroanatomy ===
According to David Geary, g_{f} and g_{c} can be traced to two separate brain systems. Fluid intelligence involves the dorsolateral prefrontal cortex, the anterior cingulate cortex, and other systems related to attention and short-term memory. Crystallized intelligence appears to be a function of brain regions that involve the storage and usage of long-term memories, such as the hippocampus.

=== Research on training working memory and the training's indirect effect on fluid ability ===
Because working memory is thought to influence g_{f}, then training to increase the capacity of working memory could have a positive impact on g_{f}. Some researchers, however, question whether the results of training interventions to enhance g_{f} are long-lasting and transferable, especially when these techniques are used by healthy children and adults without cognitive deficiencies. A meta-analytical review published in 2012 concluded that "memory training programs appear to produce short-term, specific training effects that do not generalize."

In a series of four individual experiments involving 70 participants (mean age of 25.6) from the University of Bern community, Jaeggi et al. found that, in comparison to a demographically matched control group, healthy young adults who practiced a demanding working memory task (dual n-back) approximately 25 minutes per day for between 8 and 19 days had significantly greater pre-to-posttest increases in their scores on a matrix test of fluid intelligence. There was no long-term follow-up to assess how enduring the effects of training were.

Two later n-back studies did not support the findings of Jaeggi et al. Although participants' performance on the training task improved, these studies showed no significant improvement in the mental abilities tested, especially fluid intelligence and working memory capacity.

Thus the balance of findings suggests that training for the purpose of increasing working memory can have specific short-term effects but no effects on g_{f}.

== See also ==
- 21st century skills
- CHC theory
- Deeper learning
- Flynn effect
- General intelligence factor
- Intelligence
- John L. Horn
- Malleability of intelligence
- Nootropic
- Outline of human intelligence
- Psychometrics
- Raymond Cattell
- Spatial intelligence (psychology)
- Three-stratum theory
