= Spearman's hypothesis =

Hypothesis in intelligence research

Spearman's hypothesis is a conjecture that has played a historical role in debates surrounding race and intelligence. Its original formulation was that the magnitudes of black–white differences on tests of cognitive ability positively correlate with the tests' g-loading. The subsequent formulation was that the magnitude of black–white difference on tests of cognitive ability is entirely or mainly a function of the extent to which a test measures general mental ability, or g.

Spearman's hypothesis has been criticized by scientists on both methodological and empirical grounds. Historically, it has been used to support racial pseudoscience.

== Description ==
The hypothesis, first formalized by Arthur Jensen in the 1980s based on Charles Spearman's earlier comments on the topic, stated that the magnitude of the differences is directly related to the magnitude of the g-loadings of a test. Jensen devised the method of correlated vectors (MCV) to study this hypothesis and published his research in his paper, "The nature of the black–white difference on various psychometric tests: Spearman's hypothesis", a paper which elicited 29 comments from experts in the field. Jensen went on to argue that the finding of a positive correlation between group differences and g-loadings would support the hypothesis that the group differences were largely in general mental ability—the later formulation of Spearman's hypothesis. The validity of this inference has been much debated.

== Related hypotheses ==
=== Group differences ===
Closely related to Spearman's hypothesis is the hypothesis that the magnitude of certain group differences correlates with within-group heritability estimates. Arthur Jensen and J. Phillippe Rushton, for example, reported in 2010 that the found psychometric meta-analytic correlation between g-loadings and heritability estimates was 1.

The international data, though, has challenged this finding: a study from Japan published in 2014 did find a correlation between g-loading and heritability, but only a third of that found by Jensen & Rushton; one from 2015 covering Korea that found no clear link between heritability and g-loadings of IQ subtests; and one from 2016 by Voronin, te Nijenhuis, and Malykh found negative correlations between g-loadings and heritability in two samples of Russian twins.

== Criticism ==
Spearman's hypothesis has often been taken to imply natural differences in black–white general intelligence, a conclusion that is rejected by a strong consensus within the scientific community. Historically, it has been used to justify pseudo-scientific racist theories.

Spearman's hypothesis and the arguments that invoke it have received multiple criticisms, including criticisms of Jensen's method of correlated vectors, of the inference that the first formulation of Spearman's hypothesis supports the second, and of genetic and biological arguments made on the basis of Spearman's hypothesis.

First, Jensen's MCV has been criticized with regards to the original formulation of Spearman's hypothesis. Peter Schönemann and others argue that MCV produces tautological results; Schönemann further notes that Jensen's summary of Spearman's hypothesis is vaguely defined and essentially presents two contradictory interpretations. Dolan and Lubke (2001) find Schönemann's argument that the correlations are positive by mathematical necessity unconvincing; however, they agree with his broader concern about whether his correlations are a good test of the role of g in racial intelligence differences. Ashton and Lee (2005) argue that MCV can produce spurious results.

Second, Jensen's MCV has been criticized with regards to the claim that it supports the later formulation of Spearman's hypothesis. Dolan et al. (2004) argue that MCV lacks specificity: that is, that instances not including g differences could create a positive correlation between the magnitude of the group differences and the g-loadings. Dolan et al. (2004) note that they are specifically criticizing MCV as a way of proving that group differences largely or totally represent g differences; they don't argue against Spearman's hypothesis as originally formulated and they do not argue that the larger body of evidence does not support Spearman's hypothesis as later formulated. Hunt and Carlson summarize criticism:

The essence of these objections is that the method of correlated vectors does not consider alternative hypotheses concerning the latent traits that might give rise to the observed difference in test scores. When a more appropriate method of analysis, multigroup confirmatory factor analysis, is applied, it has been found that Spearman's hypothesis (i.e., that the difference is due to differences in general intelligence) is only one of several models that could give rise to the observed distributions in test scores (Dolan, 2000). These findings render the method of correlated vectors ambiguous—which is not the same as saying that the Jensen-Rushton position is incorrect. Our point is that the argument for the default hypothesis is an indirect one. It would be far better if a direct causal argument could be made linking racial/ethnic genetic differences to studies of the development of the brain.

Third, arguments based on Spearman's hypothesis have been criticized. Some have argued that culturally caused differences could produce a correlation between g-loadings and group differences. Flynn (2010) has criticized the basic assumption that confirmation of Spearman's hypothesis would support a partially genetic explanation for IQ differences. He argues that environmental causes for average group IQ differences would cause the differences to be greater for more complex tasks.
