= John J. McArdle =

American psychologist

John J. (Jack) McArdle
- Born: John Joseph McArdle; August 24, 1951
- Died: February 4, 2022 (aged 70)
- Education: Franklin & Marshall College (BA); Hofstra University (MA, PhD)
- Known for: Quantitative research
- Awards: Fellow of the American Association for the Advancement of Science (2012)
- Scientific career
- Fields: Quantitative Psychology; Gerontology; Developmental Psychology
- Workplaces: University of Southern California
- Thesis: An Applied Monte Carlo Examination of Type I Behavior in Univariate and Multivariate Strategies for Repeated Measures Hypotheses (1977)

John J. McArdle was an American psychologist and professor of psychology and gerontology at the University of Southern California (USC), where he was also director of the Unified Studies of Cognition (CogUSC) Lab. He was known for his work on quantitative research methodology and on the changes in cognitive function and personality that occur as individuals age.

== Education and career ==
McArdle received his B.A. from Franklin & Marshall College in 1973 and his M.A. and Ph.D. from Hofstra University in 1975 and 1977, respectively. He then began postdoctoral work at the University of Denver with John L. Horn. In 1984, he joined the faculty of the University of Virginia to begin a quantitative methods program. In 2005, he joined the faculty of USC, where he started another quantitative research program. When he died he was a professor of psychology and gerontology at USC, the head of their Quantitative Methods training program, the director of their CogUSC lab, and a co-principal investigator of the Health and Retirement Study.

== Professional affiliations ==
McArdle was president of the Society of Multivariate Experimental Psychology from 1992 to 1993, and of the Federation of Behavioral, Psychological & Cognitive Sciences from 1996 to 1999. In 2012, he was elected as a fellow of the American Association for the Advancement of Science.

== Select publications ==
=== Books ===
- McArdle, John J.; Maydeu-Olivares, Albert (2005). Contemporary Psychometrics. Psychology Press. ISBN 9781135623166.
- McArdle, John J.; John R. Nesselroade, John (2014). Longitudinal Data Analysis Using Structural Equation Models. American Psychological Association. ISBN 9781433817151.
- McArdle, John J.; Ritschard, Gilbert, eds. (2014). Contemporary Issues in Exploratory Data Mining in the Behavioral Sciences. New York: Routledge. ISBN 978-0-415-81706-6.

=== Research papers ===
- McArdle, J. J., Ferrer-Caja, E., Hamagami, F., & Woodcock, R. W. (2002). Comparative longitudinal structural analyses of the growth and decline of multiple intellectual abilities over the life span. Developmental Psychology, 38(1), 115–142. doi:10.1037/0012-1649.38.1.115
- McArdle, J. J. (2009). Latent variable modeling of differences and changes with longitudinal data. Annual review of psychology, 60, 577–605. doi:10.1146/annurev.psych.60.110707.163612

=== Editing and contributed book chapters ===
- McArdle, J. J., & Nesselroade, J. R. (2003). Growth curve analysis in contemporary psychological research. In J. A. Schinka & W. F. Velicer (Eds.), Handbook of psychology: Research methods in psychology, Vol. 2, pp. 447–480). John Wiley & Sons Inc.
