= Lazar Stankov =

Lazar Stankov is an Australian psychologist and emeritus professor of psychology at the University of Sydney, where he taught for over thirty years. Currently, he is a professor at the Institute for Positive Psychology & Education at Australian Catholic University. He received his BA from the University of Belgrade and his PhD from the University of Denver. He is known for his research on intelligence, including studies on the link between political ideology and intelligence, the existence of emotional intelligence, and the psychology of terrorism.
