= John L. Horn =

American cognitive psychologist (1928–2006)

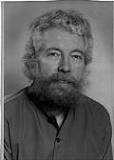
- Born: John Leonard Horn; September 7, 1928; St. Joseph, Missouri, U.S.
- Died: August 18, 2006 (aged 77); Los Angeles, California, U.S.
- Education: University of Denver; University of Melbourne; University of Illinois (PhD 1965)
- Occupation: Cognitive psychologist
- Spouse(s): Colleen Hoskins, Penelope Trickett, PhD
- Children: two sons, two daughters

John Leonard Horn (September 7, 1928 – August 18, 2006) was a scholar, cognitive psychologist and a pioneer in developing theories of intelligence. The Cattell–Horn–Carroll (CHC) theory is the basis for many modern IQ tests. Horn's parallel analysis, a method for determining the number of factors to keep in an exploratory factor analysis, is also named after him.

== The structure of mental abilities ==
For his PhD research at the University of Illinois Urbana-Champaign, Horn identified other broad intellectual abilities to supplement fluid reasoning ability (g_{f}) and crystallized ability (g_{c}) postulated by his supervisor Raymond Cattell. As with Cattell, Horn rejected the existence of an even higher level factor of general intelligence ‘g’ asserted by Spearman (1927). In Horn (1988) he reported a full list of such broad level abilities:

- g_{c} (crystallized)
- g_{f} (fluid)
- g_{v} (visual)
- g_{a} (auditory)
- q_{f} (quantitative)
- g_{s} (processing speed)
- TSR (Long-term storage and retrieval)
- SAR (Short-term acquisition and retrieval)

The Cattell-Horn model was, more or less, replicated by Carroll's (1993) analysis of 450+ intelligence measures, which also yielded a higher order factor similar to Spearman’s ‘g’. McGrew (2005) reported that in 1999 the test publisher "Riverside Publishing met with Horn and Carroll privately in Chapel Hill, North Carolina, to seek a common, more meaningful umbrella term that would recognise the strong structural similarities of their respective theoretical models, yet also recognize their differences. This sequence of conversations resulted in a verbal agreement that the phrase “Cattell-Horn-Carroll theory of cognitive abilities” made significant practical sense, and appropriately recognized the historical order of scholarly contribution of the three primary contributors."

The Cattell-Horn- Carroll (CHC) theory is the basis for many modern IQ tests. Horn's parallel analysis, a method for determining the number of factors to keep in an exploratory factor analysis, is also named after him.

== Biography ==
He started his career as a Lecturer of Educational Psychology at the University of California, Berkeley in 1967. He was Associate Professor of Psychology at the University of Denver from 1970 to 1986. Meanwhile, he was also Research Associate at the Institute of Psychiatry of the University of London in England in 1972 and Research Associate of Psychiatric Clinic at the University Hospital in Lund, Sweden 1982. He was then Professor of Psychology & Head of Adult Development and Aging University of Southern California from 1986 to 2006.

He received numerous awards, including: Research Career Development Award, National Institutes of Health (1968–1972); Annual Prize for Distinguished Publications in Multivariate Psychology (SMEP) (1972); Lifetime Achievement Award, SMEP (1992). While obtaining his doctorate at the University of Illinois, Horn was involved with local chapters of the National Association for the Advancement of Colored People and the American Civil Liberties Union.

He died in 2006.
