= Esq =

Esq or ESQ may refer to:

- Employee screening questionnaire, a psychological test developed by Canadian psychology professor Douglas N. Jackson
- Esquire (abbreviated Esq.), a modern, informal, non-royally awarded title
- Ensoniq ESQ-1, a synthesizer released by Ensoniq in 1985
- Infiniti ESQ, a Chinese-Japanese subcompact SUV
