= Wide Range Intelligence Test =

Type of psychometric test

The Wide Range Intelligence test (WRIT) is an assessment of verbal (crystallized) and visual (fluid) IQ. Running at approximately 30 minutes, the WRIT is shorter than traditional IQ tests. The test also involves only four subtests and requires fewer physical materials than a typical test. It was created alongside the Wide Range Achievement Test 3 (WRAT3), a measure of reading comprehension and academic ability, by Pearson Education in 2000. The WRIT is intended to assess those aged 4 through 85. It is designed for easy administration among trained psychologists, which is accomplished using a hierarchical model that frequently occurs in psychological testing.

== Development ==
The WRIT is one of many short-form IQ tests developed since the Wechsler-Bellevue scale, an early model for intelligence testing, was created. The popular shortening of IQ tests, especially those intended for children, is primarily due to the increasingly heavy workloads of school psychologists. Experts have historically argued that these shorter tests are less accurate. The WRIT is an attempt to optimize accuracy in a short-form IQ test that includes fewer subtests.

The test was developed with a stratified sample of 2,285 people aged 4 to 85. The test was published by British testing company Pearson in 2000; its manual was written by Joseph Glutting, Wayne Adams, and David Sheslow.

== Method ==
The WRIT begins with a visual subtest involving matrices. These are followed by verbal analogies, visual diamonds, and a vocabulary test. Specific administration and starting points are determined by age range.

=== Matrices ===
In the first portion of the test, examinees are given a limited amount of time to select an image that satisfies a relationship in a series of images. Matrices are typically a series of shapes with implied relationships in shape, shading, or transformation. This subtest is nonverbal and is completed on an easel.

=== Verbal Analogies ===
This test is administered verbally. The examiner provides a statement such as "A cat to a kitten is a dog to a ___." The examinee is asked to complete this statement. Verbal analogies are used to determine verbal, crystallized intelligence and demonstrate an understanding of oral language. There is no visual element to this subtest, and pronunciation guides are not provided for the administrator.

=== Visual Diamonds ===
Under a specified time limit, the examinee is asked to reproduce two- or three-dimensional patterns using diamond-shaped cardboard chips. This test is intended to require low physical dexterity and focus on higher spatial understanding and visual manipulation skills. The test is presented in easel format with no verbal element except initial instructions.

=== Vocabulary Test ===
In the vocabulary test, the examinee defines words given by the examiner. The test has no visual elements. Unlike the verbal analogies subtest, the vocabulary test provides a pronunciation guide for more difficult words.

== Effectiveness and criticism ==
=== Standardization ===
The standardization of the WRIT is generally deemed effective in regards to demographics. The test was developed with a demographic sample based on the 1997 U.S. census. Though some aspects of this sample are generally considered adequate, experts have criticized these trials due to educational discrepancies in some age groups. In young adult demographics, individuals with college educations were overrepresented. This has caused speculation of possible inaccuracy in the WRIT scale.

A noted positive aspect of the WRIT test is its familiarity. Since its subtest tasks mirror those of traditional, long-form IQ tests, WRIT administration is easy to learn and quickly perform accurately. The WRIT examiner form is intended to be readable, attractive, and easy to use.

The WRIT is both praised and criticized for its "ceilings and floors," or its ability to detect extremely high and low scores. The test offers an extended range of scores compared to most intelligence tests. However, its extended range is inconsistent across age ranges. For example, the test is criticized for offering an inadequate "floor" at the preschool age.

=== Practical use ===
The WRAT, which was developed in coalition with the WRIT, is often criticized for its technical limitations, unreliability, and strong potential for bias. The WRAT and the WRIT are often used together to identify learning disabilities among children. The identification system involving both these tests is thus considered questionable.

Despite the doubt surrounding shorter IQ tests, the WRIT and many similar tests—including the Wechsler Abbreviated Scale of Intelligence (WASI)—have a high correlation with full-length IQ test results. The WRIT is widely used for screening purposes, especially in preschool- and school-aged children. Although the WRIT likely suffers some loss due to its shorter length, the test is considered an effective indicator of general intelligence. Many experts also agree that the test would benefit from more extensive standardization research due to limitations in its initial trials.
