= Multidimensional Aptitude Battery II =

Group-administered intelligence test

The Multidimensional Aptitude Battery II is a group-administered intelligence test created by psychologist Douglas N. Jackson which is designed to measure Verbal, Performance and Full Scale IQ. The battery consists of 10 subtests and is used for various professional, medical, military, government, law enforcement and employment settings. The test-retest reliability based on timed performance correlates with values of 0.95 for the verbal section, 0.96 for the performance section and 0.97 for the full scale.

== Subtests and items ==
Verbal section	Description	Performance section	Description
Information	Assess general knowledge about diverse topics	Digit symbol	Assess ability to learn new coding system and using it in context
Comprehension	Assess the ability to analyze social situations, identify appropriate behavior, and explain why certain laws and customs are practiced.	Picture completion	Assess ability to identify and solve missing elements in picture.
Arithmetic	Assess the ability to solve numerical problems, reasoning and problem solving abilities.	Spatial	Assess ability to visualize abstract objects in different positions within 2 dimensional space.
Similarities	Assess the ability to recognize, compare and reason the likeness and differences between individual objects.	Picture arrangement	Ability to identify a meaningful sequence from a random sequence
Vocabulary	Assess the learned words, verbal concepts and ability to store, categorize and retrieve information appropriately.	Object assembly	Ability to identify an object by solving left-to right sequences of disarranged segments.

Citation.

== Description ==
The MAB II was created by psychologist Douglas N. Jackson and published by the company SIGMA Assessment Systems Inc. It is designed to measure intellectual abilities of both adults and adolescents from ages 16 and over and can be used in any educational and career counselling settings, business, industries, clinics and mental health facilities for basic research. It can also be used in the government, law enforcement and military settings. MAB II is also available in languages such as Spanish and French. Both the Verbal and Performance subtests on the MAB II takes 50 mins to finish either through computer administration or psychologist administration. All of the subtests are also constructed through multiple choice questions and went through fair item selection for diverse groups including gender, nationality, age and culture. Age norms are also presented in the manual that comes with test.

Despite not being designed with the CHC model in mind, one study found that the test data conformed to this model.

== See also ==
- Woodcock-Johnson Tests of Cognitive Abilities
- WAIS IV
- Raven's Progressive Matrices
- Standford-Binet Intelligence Scales
- Reynolds Intellectual Assessment Scales
- IQ
