= FNBP1L =

Protein-coding gene in humans

Identifiers
- Aliases: FNBP1L, C1orf39, TOCA1, formin binding protein 1 like
- External IDs: OMIM: 608848; MGI: 1925642; GeneCards: FNBP1L

Gene location (Human)
Chr.	Chromosome 1 (human)
Band	1p22.1	Start	93,448,118 bp
Band	1p22.1	End	93,554,661 bp

Gene location (Mouse)
Chr.	Chromosome 3 (mouse)
Band	3|3 G1	Start	122,332,368 bp
Band	3|3 G1	End	122,413,364 bp
RNA expression pattern
Bgee	Human / Mouse (ortholog); Top expressed in: ganglionic eminence; amniotic fluid; ventricular zone; glomerulus; metanephric glomerulus; renal medulla; parotid gland; jejunal mucosa; visceral pleura; hair follicle / Top expressed in: hand; superior cervical ganglion; trigeminal ganglion; medial ganglionic eminence; otic vesicle; primary oocyte; medullary collecting duct; secondary oocyte; fossa; renal corpuscle; More reference expression data
BioGPS	n/a
Gene ontology
Molecular function	protein binding; lipid binding; GTPase binding; cadherin binding
Cellular component	cytoplasm; membrane; plasma membrane; cell cortex; cytoskeleton; cytoplasmic vesicle; cytosol
Biological process	endocytosis; vesicle organization; membrane invagination; plasma membrane tubulation; autophagy; clathrin-dependent endocytosis; vesicle budding from membrane; vesicle transport along actin filament; positive regulation of filopodium assembly; cilium assembly; membrane organization
Sources:Amigo / QuickGO
Orthologs
Databases	NCBI: entry; OMA: entry
Species	Human	Mouse
Entrez	54874	214459
Ensembl	ENSG00000137942	ENSMUSG00000039735
UniProt	Q5T0N5	Q8K012
RefSeq (mRNA)	NM_001024948; NM_001164473; NM_017737	NM_001114665; NM_153118
RefSeq (protein)	NP_001020119; NP_001157945; NP_060207	n/a
Location (UCSC)	Chr 1: 93.45 – 93.55 Mb	Chr 3: 122.33 – 122.41 Mb
PubMed search
- Wikidata
View/Edit Human	View/Edit Mouse

Formin-binding protein 1-like is a protein that in humans is encoded by the FNBP1L gene.

== Function ==
The protein encoded by this gene binds to both CDC42 and N-WASP. This protein promotes CDC42-induced actin polymerization by activating the N-WASP-WIP complex and, therefore, is involved in a pathway that links cell surface signals to the actin cytoskeleton. Alternative splicing results in multiple transcript variants encoding different isoforms.

== Clinical significance ==
FNBP1L polymorphisms, specifically the SNP rs236330 has been associated with normally varying intelligence differences in adults and in children.
