= H. Carl Haywood =

American psychologist (1931–2020)

H. Carl Haywood (July 2, 1931 - October 12, 2020) was an American psychologist who researched motivational influences on learning and development, intellectual and cognitive development, cognitive education, learning, neuropsychology (especially learning potential of persons with traumatic brain injury), and dynamic/interactive assessment of learning potential.

== Career ==
Haywood attended West Georgia College from 1948 to 1950, then served in the United States Navy from August 1950 to June 1954. He earned a BA in 1956 and MA in 1957, both in psychology, from San Diego State College, since 1974 San Diego State University and a PhD in clinical psychology, with minors in experimental psychology and education, in 1961 from University of Illinois Urbana-Champaign. He joined the George Peabody College for Teachers, now part of Vanderbilt University, in 1962, rising to full professor in 1969. From 1971 to 1983 Haywood was director of the John F. Kennedy Center for Research on Education and Human Development. He was appointed Professor of Neurology, Vanderbilt University School of Medicine in 1971. Following retirement from Vanderbilt University he founded the Graduate School of Education and Psychology at Touro College, New York City, and served as its dean until his second retirement in August 2000. He served as Chairman, Committee on Peer Review, National Institute of Handicapped Research, United States Department of Education from 1980 to 1981. Appointed by President Reagan to the National Advisory Child Health and Human Development Council, Haywood served from 1983 to 1988. Since 1994 Haywood has been a Professor, Emeritus at Vanderbilt University.

Haywood served as editor of the American Journal of Mental Deficiency from 1969 to 1979, and editor of the Journal of Cognitive Education and Psychology from 1999 to 2006. He has published more than 250 articles, books, and reviews in his research fields of intellectual disability, cognitive education, motivation, and psychological assessment.

== Service ==
From 1975 to 1977, Haywood was Vice President for Psychology of the American Association on Mental Deficiency, now American Association on Intellectual and Developmental Disability, and President of the association from 1980 to 1981. From 1978 to 1979, he was president of the American Psychological Association's Division on Mental Retardation. From 1980 to 1982, he also served on the American Psychological Association's Council of Representatives. From 1988 to 1992, Haywood served as president of the International Association for Cognitive Education.

== Honors ==
Haywood was elected to the Institute of Medicine (now National Academy of Medicine) in 1972. In 1985, he received the National Leadership Award from the American Association on Mental Deficiency, and its Research Award in 1989. In 1988 Haywood received the Edgar A. Doll Award, from APA's Division 33, for Research on Mental Retardation. In 1993, he was recognized by Vanderbilt University with its Alexander Heard Distinguished Service Professorship. In 2018, Haywood won a Marquis Who's Who Humanitarian Award.

== Notable Books ==
H. Carl Haywood (1968). Brain Damage in School Age Children. Council on Exceptional Children. LC Cat. No. 68-21905

H. Carl Haywood (1970). Social-Cultural Aspects of Mental Retardation. Appleton-Century-Crofts (ISBN 978-0-390-42635-2)

H.Carl Haywood and J. R. Newbrough (1981). Living environments for developmentally retarded persons. University Park Press (ISBN 978-0-8391-1663-9)

Michael J. Begab, H. Carl Haywood, Howard L. Garber (1982) Psychosocial Influences in Retarded Performance (Nichd-Mental Retardation Research Centers Series). Univ Park Press (ISBN 978-0-8391-1634-9)

H. Carl Haywood, David Tzuriel (1991). Interactive Assessment. Springer (ISBN 978-0-387-97587-0)

H. Carl Haywood, Penelope Brooks, Susan Burns(1992). Bright Start: Cognitive Curriculum for Young Children. Charlesbridge (ISBN 978-0-88106-376-9)

Sarah L. Friedman, H. Carl Haywood (1994). Developmental Followup: Concepts, Domains, and Methods. Academic Press. ISBN 0-12-267855-9, 0-12-267856-7

H. Carl Haywood, Carol Schneider Lidz (2007). Dynamic Assessment in Practice: Clinical and Educational Applications. Cambridge University Press (ISBN 978-0-521-61412-2)

== Personal life ==
Haywood grew up in Thomaston, Georgia. Apart from his professional career, he was also a talented pianist and singer. He had four children.
