= Reuven Feuerstein =

Israeli clinical, developmental and cognitive psychologist

- ראובן פוירשטיין
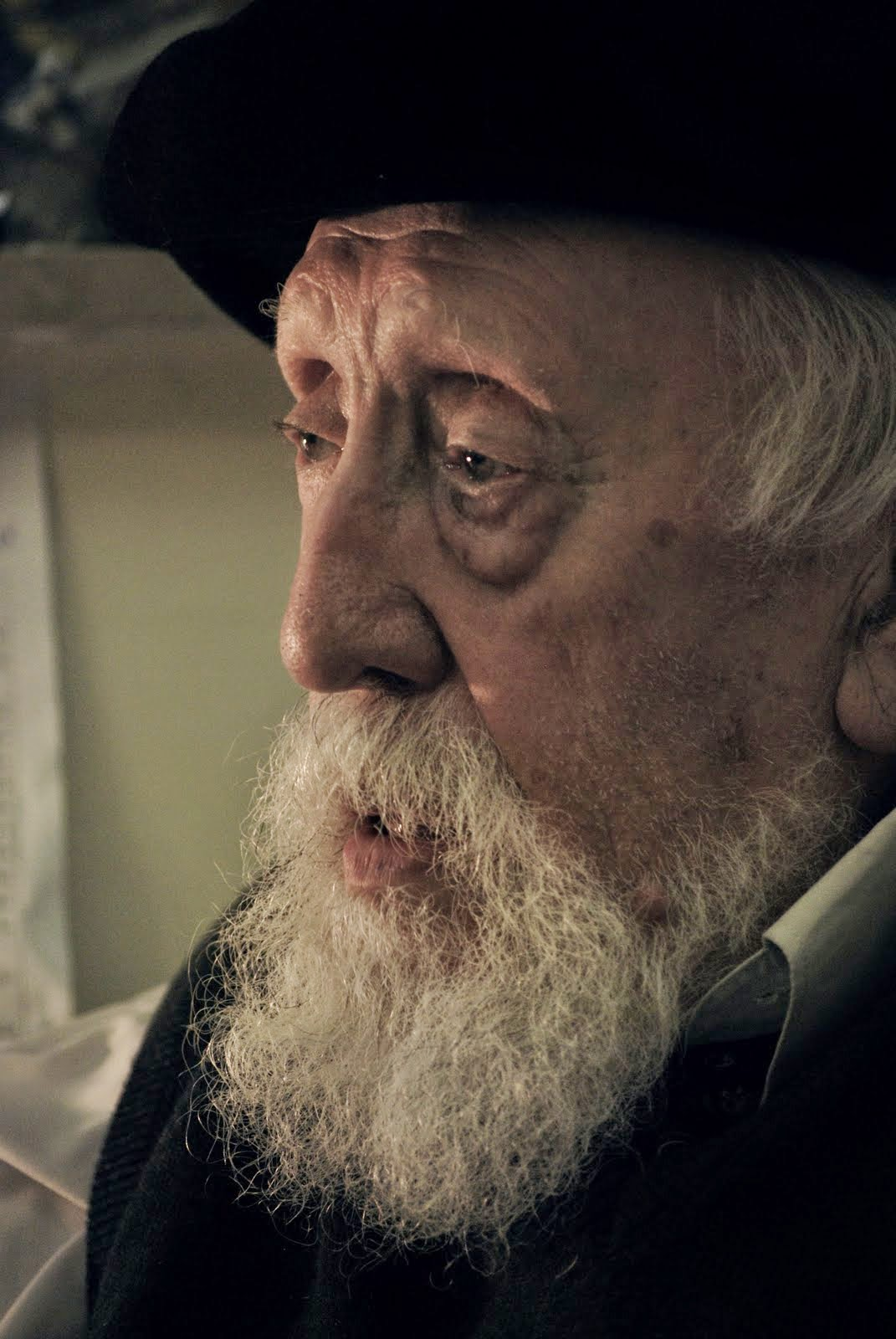
- Born: August 21, 1921; Botoşani, Romania
- Died: April 29, 2014 (aged 92); Jerusalem, Israel
- Occupation: Psychologist

Reuven Feuerstein (Hebrew: ראובן פוירשטיין; August 21, 1921 – April 29, 2014) was a Romanian-born Israeli clinical, developmental, and cognitive psychologist, known for his theory of intelligence. Feuerstein is recognized for his work in developing the theories and applied systems of structural cognitive modifiability, mediated learning experience, cognitive map, deficient cognitive functions, learning propensity assessment device, instrumental enrichment programs, and shaping modifying environments. These interlocked practices provide educators with the skills and tools to systematically develop students’ cognitive functions and operations to build meta-cognition.

Feuerstein was the founder and director of the International Center for the Enhancement of Learning Potential (ICELP) in Jerusalem, Israel. For more than 50 years, Feuerstein's theories and applied systems have been implemented in both clinical and classroom settings internationally, with more than 80 countries applying his work. Feuerstein's theory on the malleability of intelligence has led to more than 2,000 scientific research studies and countless case studies with various learning populations.

== Early life and education ==
Reuven Feuerstein was one of nine siblings born in Botoșani, Romania. He attended the Teachers College in Bucharest (1940–41) and Onesco College in Bucharest (1942–1944). Feuerstein fled the Nazi invasion before obtaining his degree in psychology. After settling in Mandate Palestine in 1945, he taught child survivors of the Holocaust until 1948. Seeing that these children affected by the Holocaust needed attention, he began a career that attended to the psychological and educational needs of immigrant refugee children.

While attending the University of Geneva, Feuerstein studied under Andre Rey and Jean Piaget. He completed his degrees in both General and Clinical Psychology. During this time there were three main schools of thought, psychoanalysis, behaviorism and Gestalt psychology. He attended lectures given by Karl Jaspers, Carl Jung, Bärbel Inhelder, Marguerite Loosli Uster and Léopold Szondi. In 1970, Feuerstein earned his PhD in developmental psychology at the University of Sorbonne, in France. His major areas of study were Developmental, Clinical, and Cognitive Psychology.

== Career and theories ==
Feuerstein served as Director of Psychological Services of Youth Aliyah in Europe (Immigration for young people), a service that assigned prospective Jewish candidates for emigration from all over the European continent to various educational programs in Israel. In the 1950s he researched Moroccan, Jewish, and Berber children in collaboration with several members of the Genevan school. Upon their arrival, the children were subjected to a series of tests, including IQ tests, achieving poor results that improved whenever Feuerstein interviewed them.

The improvements Feuerstein witnessed in victims after they received extra psychological and educational attention made him question current beliefs regarding the stability and innateness of intelligence. Feuerstein elaborated new methods of evaluation as well as new teaching tools, known today as dynamic assessment. education and meeting children's psychological needs in fostering success in school and high intelligence scores. "It was during this period that much of the psychological data was gathered that contributed to my development of concepts of cultural differences and cultural deprivations" Some children who were considered un-teachable were eventually accepted at mainstream schools and learned successfully. This period was also seminal in the development of his working hypothesis concerning low-functioning children and their potential for change.

His interest came from observing the difficulties experienced by the new immigrant students coping with unfamiliar learning environment that he saw as culturally "deprived." He describes culturally "different" children who receive an adequate amount and type of mediated learning experience (MLE) in their native culture and who face the challenges of adapting to a new culture. These children are expected to have good learning potential. On the contrary, culturally "deprived" are those children who were deprived on MLE in their native culture or children who show a reduction in learning potential.

Comparisons have also been made between Feuerstein's theories and those of the Russian psychologist Lev Vygotsky. Vygotsky viewed a child's interaction with the world as mediated by symbolic tools provided by the given culture. Like the social psychologist, Feuerstein gave further insight on cognitive functioning such as logical memory, voluntary attention, categorical perception and self-regulation of behavior. Feuerstein filled a theoretical gap with his theory of Mediated Learning Experience in which he assigns the major role to a human mediator. According to Feuerstein, all learning interactions can be divided into direct learning and mediated learning. Learning mediated by another human being is indispensable for a child because the mediator helps the child develop prerequisites that then make direct learning effective.

The heart of MLE is the theory of structural cognitive modifiability (SCM), which explains the modifiability of deficient cognitive functions. He argued that person's capability to learn is not solely determined by one's genetic make-up; but cognitive enhancement is achieved through mediation. "Cognitive enhancement in SCM refers not merely to the development of specific behavior but also to changes of a 'structural nature'". Feuerstein said he was deeply influenced by Rabbi Menachem Mendel Schneerson, with whom he corresponded, and who would refer patients to him.

Unlike previous developmental psychologists, the focus of Feuerstein's theories is the development of normal versus low functioning children. According to Piaget, it is through the normal child's own natural material actions and problem-solving experiences that mind and intelligence eventually evolve toward the development of logic and abstract thinking. Feuerstein illustrates that the key to meaningful instruction for all children, particularly young and low-functioning children, is the mediated relationship.

=== The cognitive map ===
Another important conceptual tool of the dynamic assessment process is the need to understand the relationship between the characteristics of the task and the performance of the subject. The cognitive map describes the mental act in terms of several parameters that permit an analysis and interpretation of a subject's performance by locating specific problem areas and producing changes in corresponding dimensions. The manipulation of these parameters becomes highly important in the subject-examiner interaction, by helping the examiner to form and validate hypotheses regarding the subject's performance difficulties.

=== FIE Standard ===
The FIE Standard program goal is to correct deficiencies in fundamental thinking skills, and to provide students with the concepts, skills, strategies, operations and techniques necessary to function as independent learners. It aims to increase their motivation, meta-cognition. Deliberately free of specific subject matter, the tasks in the instruments are intended to be transferable (bridged) to all educational and everyday life situations.

To date FIE program has been successfully used across the world in the following frameworks:

- Remedial programs for special needs children.
- Cognitive rehabilitation of brain injured individuals and psychiatric patients.
- Learning enhancement programs for immigrant and cultural minority students.
- Enrichment programs for underachieving, regular and gifted children.
- Professional training and retraining programs in the industrial, military, and business sectors.

Research on the efficacy of this method has been conducted in several samples including engineers at a Motorola (USA) plant, impoverished students in rural communities (Bahia, Brazil), deaf, non-literate immigrants (Ethiopia), Autistic and Down syndrome children (Jerusalem), low-performing high school math students (Cleveland, Ohio, USA), weak readers in middle grades (Portland, Oregon, USA), and other groups. FIE was included into the package of educational reform programs recommended by the US Department of Education. Due to its long history and application, FIE Standard is one of the most researched of the cognitive intervention programs, with over one thousand related publications and hundreds of analyses on the performance of FIE in varied settings and populations. FIE is considered suitable for individuals with disabilities and those who are considered “normal” and “gifted”; cognitive gains are seen in all three categories of students who undertake FIE. The program is designed to help people of all ages, not just students.

=== FIE-BASIC ===
In 2000, Feuerstein added FIE-BASIC to prevent learning problems in younger children (3 to 8 years old) and to help low performing older children. Feuerstein claims that learning problems may be prevented through early, developmentally appropriate, intervention as well as the emerging brain research. In order to achieve these goals, an emphasis is placed on a systematic exposure of selected and necessary content areas. Specific skills are mediated and transformed into working concepts that build subsequent learning and development and the process of how to think.

The FIE- BASIC program includes a total of 7 instruments taught over 2–4 years depending on the learner's needs and/or the development of implementation. Each focuses on specific cognitive functions that are the pre-requisites to successful school learning, especially in literacy and mathematics. It is designed to be used in a classroom group setting, for smaller groups of targeted learners, and as a one-to-one therapeutic intervention. The use of the FIE-B can be a preparation for the use of the FIE-Standard (mentioned above), taking students to higher levels of mental processing and cognitive functioning.

Projects throughout the State of Alaska Head Start Program (USA), Holly, Michigan (USA) and in Israel, Britain, Italy, India, and Japan are exploring the applications of the Basic instruments with young children and students with special needs, especially as a way to avoid the over-categorization of students as learning disabled.

== Quotes ==
In 1976, four years before the publication of the first edition of Instrumental Enrichment, the Record, a journal of the NIH-US Department of Health, Education and Welfare, described the "exciting, highly imaginative project by Dr. Feuerstein" then being funded by the National Institute of Child Health and Human Development for showing that "intervention –even in adolescents – is not too late."

In a 1976 issue of the NIH Record, scientists at the National Institute of Child Health and Human Development described the Instrumental Enrichment program as holding promise for improving learning outcomes and supporting more precise educational placement based on students’ learning potential rather than prior achievement. (From N.I.H. Record, September 21, 1976, Vol. XXVIII, no. 19)

In a 1980 publication, Michael J. Begab, then head of the Mental Retardation Research Center at the NICHD, wrote that Feuerstein's work proposed a model of cognitive development distinct from Piagetian theory and sought to translate theoretical concepts into instructional practice. He stated that Feuerstein's approach aimed to bridge research and educational application, particularly in work with children from diverse backgrounds.

"Reuven Feuerstein is one of a handful of educational thinkers and practitioners who has made a significant, lasting contribution to our understanding of human learning.” —Howard Gardner, Harvard Graduate School of Education

“An innovative work addressing key educational themes.” —From the Foreword by John D. Bransford, University of Washington, College of Education

== Awards and recognition ==
- 1986, Detroit Public Schools, Special Commendation
- 1990, Médaille d'Or of Aix-les-Bains, France
- 1990, Médaille d'Or of Nevers, France
- 1991, Variety Clubs International Humanitarian Award, Vancouver, Canada
- 1991, Chevalier dans l'Ordre des Palmes Académiques, France
- 1991, Yakir Yerushalaim (Distinguished Citizen of Jerusalem)
- 1992, New York Academy of Sciences
- 1992, Israel Prize, for social sciences.
- 1997, Honor al estudio y la investigacion en el campo de la formación professional. National Organization for Professional Training. Valencia, Spain.
- 1997, Special Resolution of Commendation, Assembly, State of California, USA
- 1998, Miembro de honor; Universidad Diego Portales, Chile
- 1999, Doctorate Honoris Causa, University of Turin, Italy
- 2009, Doctorate Honoris Causa, Babeș-Bolyai University, Cluj-Napoca, Romania

== See also ==
- List of Israel Prize recipients

== Bibliography ==
Books
  - Richelle, M. and Feuerstein, R. (Under direction of Prof. Andre Rey, and in Jeannet) (1957). Enfants Juifs Nord-Africans. Tel Aviv: Youth Aliyah. collaboration with M.
  - Feuerstein, R. & Richelle, M. (Under direction of Prof. Andre Rey, and in collaboration with M. Jeannet) (1963). Children of the Mellah: Socio-cultural deprivation and its educational significance. Jerusalem: Szold Foundation (in Hebrew).
  - Feuerstein, R., Rand, Y., & Hoffman, M. (1979). The dynamic assessment of retarded performers: The learning potential assessment device (LPAD). Baltimore, MD: University Park Press.
  - Feuerstein, R., Rand, Y., & Hoffman, M., & Miller, R. (1980). Instrumental Enrichment: An intervention program for cognitive modifiability. Baltimore, MD: University Park Press. (Chinese translation, 1989)
  - Feuerstein, R., Rand, Y., Rynders, J. (1988). Don’t accept me as I am: Helping “retarded” people to excel. N.Y.: Plenum Press (Second revised edition published by Skylight in 1997; Dutch translation: Laat me niet zoals ik bem. Rotterdam: Leminscaat, 1993; Italian translation: Non accettarmi como sono. Milan: R.C.S. Libri, 1995; Japanese translation – 2000)
  - Wexler, M. and Feuerstein, R. (Eds.) (1988). Reconstructive plastic surgery for people with Down Syndrome as an element in shaping modifying environment. Jerusalem: Zak and Co. (in Hebrew).
  - Feuerstein, R. and Rand Y. (with Engels N. & Feuerstein, Ra S.) (2001). Don't accept me as I am. (New enlarged Hebrew edition). Jerusalem: ICELP Press. (Revised Italian translation: La disabilita non e un limite. Firenze: Libri Liberi, 2005; revised English edition, ICELP Press, 2006).
  - Feuerstein, R., Klein, P., & Tannenbaum, A. (Eds.)(1991). Mediated learning experience: Theoretical, psychosocial, and learning implications. Tel Aviv and London: Freund.
  - Feuerstein, R. (1998). The theory of mediated learning experience: About human as a modifiable Being. Jerusalem: Ministry of Defense Publications (in Hebrew).
  - Kozulin, A., Feuerstein, R., & Feuerstein, Ra. S. (Eds).(2001) Mediated learning experience in teaching and counseling (Proceedings of the international conferences "Models of teacher training" and "Educational advancement for youth at risk"). Jerusalem: ICELP Press.
  - Feuerstein, R., Falik, L., Rand, Y., & Feuerstein, Ra.S. (2002). The dynamic assessment of cognitive modifiability. Jerusalem: ICELP Press.
  - Feuerstein, R. et al. (2003). Feuerstein’s theory and applied systems: A reader. Jerusalem: ICELP Press.
  - Feuerstein, R. and Spire, A. (2006). La pédagogie à visage humain. Paris: Le Bord de l’Eau.
  - Feuerstein, R., Falik, L., Rand, Y., & Feuerstein, Ra.S. (2006). Creating and enhancing cognitive modifiability: The Feuerstein Instrumental Enrichment program. Jerusalem: ICELP Press.
Chapters, articles, and manuals
  - Feuerstein, R. & Richelle, M. (1958). Perception and drawing of the North African Jewish child. Megamot, 9: 156-162 (in Hebrew).
  - Feuerstein, R. & Krasilowsky, D. (1967). The treatment group technique. Israeli Annals of Psychiatry and Related Disciplines, 5: 61–90.
  - Feuerstein, R. and Shalom, H. (1967). Methods of assessing the educational level of socially and culturally disadvantaged children. Megamot, No 2-3: 177-187 (in Hebrew).
  - Feuerstein, R. (1968). The Learning Potential Assessment Device. In B.W.Richards (Ed.), Proceedings of the First Congress of the International Association for the Scientific Study of Mental Deficiency. Reigate, UK: Michael Jackson.
  - Feuerstein, R. (1970). Les differences de fonctionnement cognitif dans des groupes socio-ethniques differents. Ph.D. thesis. Sorbonne, Paris.
  - Feuerstein, R. (1970). A dynamic approach to causation, prevention, and alleviation of retarded performance. In C. Haywood (Ed.), Social-Cultural Aspects of Mental Retardation. N.Y.: Appleton, Century, Crofts.
  - Feuerstein, R., Hanegby, R., & Krasilovsky, D. (1970). The corrective object relations: Theory and treatment group technique. Psychological Processes, 1: 2.
  - Feuerstein, R. (1971). Low functioning children in residential and day settings for the deprived. In M.Wolins & M.Gottesman (Eds.), Group Care: An Israeli Approach. N.Y.: Gordon and Breach.
  - Feuerstein, R. (1971). The redevelopment of the socio-culturally disadvantaged adolescent in group care. In M.Wolins & M.Gottesman (Eds.), Group Care: An Israeli Approach. N.Y.: Gordon and Breach.
  - Feuerstein, R. (1972). Alleviation of retarded performance. In H.P.David (Ed.), Child Mental Health in International Perspective. New York: Harper and Row.
  - Feuerstein, R. (1972). Cognitive assessment of the socio-culturally deprived child and adolescent. In L.J. Cronbach and P.Drenth (Eds.), Mental tests and cultural adaptation. The Hague: Mouton.
  - Feuerstein, R. & Krasilowsky, D. (1972). Intervention strategies for the significant modification of cognitive functioning in the disadvantaged adolescent. The Journal of the American Academy of Child Psychiatry, 11: 572–582.
  - Feuerstein, R., Krasilowsky, D., and Rand, Y. (1974). The evolvement of innovative educational strategies for the integration of high risk adolescents in Israel. Phi Delta Kappan, 35: 556–581.
  - Feuerstein, R. and Rand, Y. (1974). Mediated Learning Experience: An outline of proximal etiology for differential development of cognitive functions. Journal of International Council of Psychology, 9-10: 7–37.
  - Feuerstein, R. (1976). Dynamic assessment of cognitive modifiability in retarded performers: The Learning Potential Assessment Device. In B.B.Wolman (Ed.), International Encyclopedia of Neurology, Psychiatry, Psychoanalysis and Psychology, Section XII. New York.
  - Feuerstein, R., Hoffman, M., Krasilowsky, D., Rand, Y., & Tannenbaum, A. (1976). The effects of group care on the psychosocial habitation of immigrant adolescents in Israel, with special reference to high-risk children. International Review of Applied Psychology, 25: 189–201.
  - Feuerstein, R. (1977). Mediated Learning Experience (MLE): A theoretical basis for cognitive modifiability during adolescence. In P.Mittner (Ed.), Research to Practice in Mental Retardation: Education and Training, vol.2. Baltimore, MD: University Park Press.
  - Rand, Y. Feuerstein, R., Tannenbaum, A., Jensen, M., & Hoffman, M. (1977). An analysis of the effects of Instrumental Enrichment on disadvantaged adolescents. In P.Mittner (Ed.), Research to Practice in Mental Retardation: Education and Training, vol.2. Baltimore, MD: University Park Press.
  - Feuerstein, R., Krasilowsky, D., & Rand, Y. (1978). Modifiability during adolescence. In J. Anthony (Ed.), Yearbook of the International Association for Chile Psychiatry and Allied Professions. London: Wiley.
  - Feuerstein, R. (1979). Ontogeny of learning. in M.T.Brazier (Ed.), Brain Mechanisms in Memory and Learning. New York: Raven Press.
  - Rand, Y., Feuerstein, R., Hoffman, M., & Jensen, M. (1979). Cognitive modifiability in retarded adolescents. American Journal of Mental Deficiency, 83: 539–550.
  - Rand, Y., Tannenbaum, A. & Feuerstein, R. (1979). Effects of Instrumental Enrichment on the psycho-educational development of low-functioning adolescents. Journal of Educational Psychology, 71: 751–763.
  - Feuerstein, R. & Jensen, M. (1980). Instrumental Enrichment: Theoretical basis, goals, and instruments. The Educational Forum, 44: 401–423.
  - Feuerstein, R. (1981). Mediated learning experience in the acquisition of kinesics. In R. Saint-Claire and B. Hoffer (Eds.), Developmental Kinesics: The Emerging Paradigm. Baltimore, MD: University Park Press.
  - Feuerstein, R., Miller, R., Rand, Y. & Jensen, M. (1981) Can evolving techniques better measure cognitive change? The Journal of Special Education, 15: 201–219.
  - Feuerstein, R. & Hoffman, M. (1982). Intergenerational conflict of rights: Cultural imposition and self-realization. Viewpoints in Teaching and Learning, 58: 44–63.
  - Feuerstein, R. (1984). On the desirability of preserving family and communal traditions. In The Integration of Immigrant Adolescent: A Selection of Articles of Youth Aliyah. Jerusalem: Jewish Agency.
  - Feuerstein, R., Jensen, M., Rand, Y., and Hoffman, M. (1984). Instrumental Enrichment: An intervention program for structural cognitive modifiability. In J.Segal, S. Chipman, and R. Glaser (Eds.), Thinking and Learning Skills, vol. 1. Hillsdale, N.J.: Erlbaum.
  - Feuerstein, R. & Klein, P. (1985). Environmental variables and cognitive development. In S. Harel and N.J. Anastasiow (Eds.), The At-Risk Infant: Psycho-Socio-Medical Aspects. Baltimore, MD: Paul Brookes.
  - Feuerstein, R. Rand, Y. Haywood, H.C., Hoffman, M.B., Jensen, M.R., et al. (1985). Learning Potential Assessment Device Manual. Jerusalem: HWCRI.
  - Feuerstein, R., Rand, Y., Jensen, M., Kaniel, S., Tzuriel, D., Ben Schachar, N., Mintzker, Y. (1985/86). Learning potential assessment. Special Services in the Schools, 2: 85–106.
  - Feuerstein, R. (1986). The foster home group experiment. In Y.Kashti and M.Arieli (Eds.), Residential Settings and the Community. Tel Aviv: Freund.
  - Feuerstein, R., Hoffman, M., Rand, Y. Jensen, M., Tzuriel, D., Hoffman, D. (1986). Learning to learn: Mediated learning experience and Instrumental Enrichment. Special Services in the Schools, 3: 49–82.
  - Feuerstein, R., Rand, Y., Jensen, M., Kaniel, S., & Tzuriel, D. (1987). Prerequisites for assessment of learning potential: The LPAD model. In C.Lidz (Ed.), The Dynamic Assessment. N.Y.: Guilford Press.
  - Arieli, M. & Feuerstein, R. (1987). The two-fold care organization: On the combination of group and foster situations. Child and Youth Care Quarterly, 16: 168–184.
  - Jensen, M. & Feuerstein, R. (1987). The LPAD: from philosophy to practice. In C.Lidz (Ed.), The Dynamic Assessment. N.Y.: Guilford Press.
  - Feuerstein, R., Jensen, M., Rand, Y., Kaniel, S. & Tzuriel, D. (1988). Cultural difference and cultural deprivation: A theoretical framework for differential intervention. In R.M.Gupta and P.Coxhead (Eds.), Cultural Diversity and Learning Efficiency. London: Macmillan.
  - Strauss, R., Mintzker, Y., Feuerstein, R., Wexler, M-R., Rand, Y. (1988). Social perception of the effects of Down Syndrome facial surgery: A school-based study of ratings by normal adolescents. Plastic and Reconstructive Surgery, 81: 841–846.
  - Tzuriel, D. and Samuels, M.& Feuerstein, R. (1988). Non-intellective factors in dynamic assessment. In R.M.Gupta and P.Coxhead (Eds.), Cultural Diversity and Learning Efficiency. London: Macmillan.
  - Kaniel, S. & Feuerstein, R. (1989). Special needs of children with learning difficulties. Oxford Review of Education, 15: 165–179.
  - Feuerstein, R. (1990). The cognitive modifiability of persons with Down Syndrome. In E.Chigier (Ed.), Looking Up at Down Syndrome. Tel Aviv & London: Freund.
  - Feuerstein, R. (1990). Mediating cognitive processes to the retarded performer. In M.Schwebel, C.Maher, and N.Fagley (Eds.), Promoting Cognitive Growth over the Life-span. Hillsdale, N.J.: Erlbaum.
  - Feuerstein, R. (1990). The theory of structural cognitive modifiability. In B.Presseisen (Ed.), Learning and Thinking Styles: Classroom Interaction. Washington, DC: National Education Association.
  - Beker, J. & Feuerstein, R. (1990). Conceptual foundations of the modifying environment in group care and treatment settings *for children and youth. Journal of Child and Youth Care, 5: 23–33.
  - Falik, L. & Feuerstein, R. (1990). Structural cognitive modifiability: A new cognitive perspective for counseling and psychotherapy. International Journal of Cognitive Education and Mediated Learning, 1: 143–150.
  - Feuerstein, R. (1991). Cultural difference and cultural deprivation. Differential patterns of adaptability. In N.Bleichrodt and P.Drenth (Eds.), Contemporary Issues in Cross-Cultural Psychology. Amsterdam: Swets & Zeitlinger.
  - Feuerstein, R. & Feuerstein, S. (1991). Mediated learning experience: A theoretical review. In R. Feuerstein, P. Klein, & A. Tannenbaum,(Eds.), Mediated learning experience: Theoretical, Psychosocial, and Learning Implications. Tel Aviv and London: Freund.
  - Feuerstein, R., Rand, Y., Hoffman, M., Egozi, M., & Ben-Schachar, N. (1991). Intervention programs for retarded performers: Goals, means, and expected outcomes. In L.Idol and B.Jones (Eds.), Educational Values and Cognitive Instruction. Vol.2. Hillsdale, N.J.: Erlbaum. (Reprinted in M.Ben-Hur (Ed.), On Feuerstein’s Instrumental Enrichment. Palatine, IL: IRI/Skylight, 1994).
  - Feuerstein, R & Tannenbaum, A. (1991). Mediating the learning experience of gifted underachievers. In B. Wallace and H.Adams (Eds.), Worldwide Perspectives on the Gifted Underachievers. Bicester, UK: AB Academic Publishers.
  - Beker, J. & Feuerstein, R. (1991). Toward a common denominator in effective group care programming. Journal of Child and Youth Care, 7: 20–34.
  - Beker, J. & Feuerstein, R. (1991). The modifying environment and other environmental perspectives in group care. Residential Treatment of Children and Youth, 8: 21–37.
  - Kaniel, S., Tzuriel, D., Feuerstein, R., Ben-Schachar, N., & Eitan, T. (1991). Dynamic assessment: Learning and transfer abilities of Ethiopian immigrants to Israel. In Feuerstein, R., Klein, P., & Tannenbaum, A. (Eds.)(1991). Mediated Learning Experience: Theoretical, Psychosocial, and Learning Implications. Tel Aviv and London: Freund.
  - Tzuriel, D & Feuerstein, R. (1992). Dynamic assessment for prescriptive teaching. In C.Haywood and D.Tzuriel (Eds.), Interactive Assessment. New York: Springer.
  - Feuerstein, R. & Kozulin, A. (1995). The Bell Curve: Getting the facts straight. Educational Leadership, 52(7): 71–74.
  - Durkin, R., Beker, J., & Feuerstein, R. (1995). Can environments modify and enhance the development of personality and behavior? Residential Treatment for Children and Youth, 12: 1–14.
  - Feuerstein, R. and Hoffman, M.B. (1995). Instrumental Enrichment Teacher’s Guides. Palatine, IL: IRI/Skylight.
  - Feuerstein, R. et al. (1995). Learning Propensity Assessment Device: Manual. Jerusalem: ICELP Press.
  - Feuerstein, R. (1996). The mediated learning experience: Langeveld memorial lecture. University of Utrecht.
  - Feuerstein, R., Feuerstein, Ra., & Schur, Y. (1997). Process as content in education of exceptional children. In A.Costa & R. Liebman (Eds.), Supporting the Spirit of Learning: When Process is Content. Thousand Oaks, CA: Corwin Press. (Reprinted in A. Kozulin, Ed., The Ontogeny of Cognitive Modifiability. Jerusalem: ICELP Press, 1997).
  - Feuerstein, R., Feuerstein, Ra., & Gross, S. (1997). The learning potential assessment device. In D.Flanagan, J.Genshaft, and P.Harrison (Eds.), Contemporary Intellectual Assessment. New York: Guilford Press.
  - Feuerstein, R., Falik, L., & Feuerstein, Ra. S. (1998). Feuerstein’s LPAD. In R.Samuda (Ed.), Advances in Cross-Cultural Assessment. Thousand Oaks, CA: Sage.
  - Feuerstein, R., Jackson, Y., & Lewis, J. (1998). Feuerstein’s IE and structural cognitive modifiability. In R.Samuda (Ed.), Advances in Cross-Cultural Assessment. Thousand Oaks, CA: Sage.
  - Feuerstein, R., Falik, L., & Feuerstein, Ra. S. (1998). Definition of essential concepts and terms: A working glossary of SCM, MLE, LPAD and IE. Jerusalem: ICELP Press.
  - Feuerstein, R., Gross, S., Brodsky Cohen, B., Levin, S. Rathner, A., Stevens, T., Brill, T., Falik, L (1998). Early detection: Blessing or curse. In S. Greenspan (Ed.), Approaches to developmental and learning disorders in infants and children (pp. 253–280). Bethesda, MD: ICDL (Revised version appeared in Oon-Seng Tan and A. Seok-Hoon Seng (Eds.), Enhancing cognitive functions. Singapore: McGraw Hill Asia, 2005)
  - Feuerstein, R., Feuerstein, Ra. S., and Schur, Y. (1999). Instrumental Enrichment: program development and implementation. In E. Peled, (Ed.), Fifty years of educational system in Israel. Jerusalem: Ministry of Education. (in Hebrew).
  - Feuerstein, R. (2000). MLE, IE and LPAD. In S. Greenspan and S. Wieder, (Eds.), International Council on Developmental and Learning Disorders Clinical Practice Guidelines. Silver Spring, MD: ICDL.
  - Feuerstein, R. and Feuerstein, Ra S. (2000). MLE and IE as a basis of the education of the blind. Educator, vol.12, pp. 1–19.
  - Feuerstein, R. and Falik, L. (2000). Cognitive modifiability: A needed perspective on learning in the 21st century. College of Education Review (San Francisco State University), vol.12, pp. 127–143
  - Feuerstein, R. and Feuerstein, Ra S. (2001) Is dynamic assessment compatible with the psychometric model? In A.Kaufman & N. Kaufman, (Eds.), Specific Learning Disabilities and Difficulties in Children and Adolescents. N.Y.: Cambridge University Press.
  - Feuerstein, R., Mintzker, Y, Feuerstein, Ra S., Ben Shachar, N., Cohen, M. and Rathner, A. (2001). Mediated Learning Experience: Guidelines for Parents. Jerusalem: ICELP Press.
  - Feuerstein, R. and Feuerstein, Ra S. (2002). The influence of MLE on the mediator. Talpiot College Yearbook. Tel-Aviv: Talpiot College (in Hebrew) (English translation available upon request at the ICELP)
  - Feuerstein, R., Feuerstein, Ra. S., & Feuerstein, A. (2003). Learning potential assessment device – Basic: Manual. Jerusalem: ICELP.
  - Feuerstein, Ra S., Feuerstein, R., & Falik, L. (2004). User’s Guide to the theory and practice of the Instrumental Enrichment-Basic. Jerusalem: ICELP.
  - Feuerstein, R., Kozulin, A. and Falik, L. (2005). Cultural difference and cultural deprivation as reflected in the dynamic assessment of Ethiopian immigrant children in Israel. Transylvanian Journal of Psychology: Special Issue on Dynamic Assessment, 1: 101–121.
  - Feuerstein, Ra S., Feuerstein, R. (2005). Learning disability or deficient learning? Permanent trait or changing state. In E.Paldi (Ed.), Education and challenge of Time – 2. Jerusalem: Histadrut Hamorim (in Hebrew).
  - Feuerstein, Ra S., Feuerstein, R., & Falik, L. (2005). The Feuerstein programs for early assessment and intervention: The LPAD-Basic and the IE-Basic. In Oon-Seng Tan and A. Seok-Hoon Seng (Eds.), Enhancing cognitive functions. Singapore: McGraw Hill Asia.
  - Feuerstein, R. (2007). Shaping modifying environments through inclusion. Transylvanian Journal of Psychology: Special Issue No 2: 9-23.
