= The g Factor: The Science of Mental Ability =

1998 book by Arthur Jensen

- Author: Arthur R. Jensen
- Publisher: Praeger
- Publication date: 1998
- Pages: 648
- ISBN: 0-275-96103-6

The g Factor: The Science of Mental Ability is a 1998 book by psychologist Arthur Jensen about the general factor of human mental ability, or g.

== Summary ==
The book traces the origins of the idea of individual differences in general mental ability to 19th century researchers Herbert Spencer and Francis Galton. Charles Spearman is credited for inventing factor analysis in the early 20th century, which enabled statistical testing of the hypothesis that general mental ability is required in all mental efforts. Spearman, gave the name g to the common factor underlying all mental tasks. He suggested that g reflected individual differences in "mental energy", and hoped that future research would uncover the biological basis of this energy. The book argues that because it is difficult to arrive at a consensual scientific definition of the term intelligence, scientists should dispense with the term and focus on specific abilities and their covariances. It also argues that mental abilities are best conceptualized as a three-level hierarchy, with a large number of narrow abilities at the base, a relatively small number of broad factors at the intermediate level, and a single general factor, g, at the apex.

The g factor can be derived from a correlation matrix of mental ability tests by many different methods of factor analysis. A g factor always emerges provided that the test battery is sufficiently large and diverse. The only exception is when one uses orthogonal rotation which precludes the appearance of a g factor. Jensen argues that orthogonal rotation is not appropriate for substantially positively correlated variables such as mental abilities. The g factor has been found to be largely invariant across different factor analytic methods and in different racial and cultural groups. Jensen argues that g is normally distributed in any population. He also contends that g cannot be described in terms of the information content or item characteristics of tests, and likens it to a computer's CPU. Jensen hypothesizes that g is fundamentally about the speed or efficiency of the neural processes related to mental abilities.

The book reviews studies on biological correlates of g, and notes that they are numerous, including brain size, latency and amplitude of evoked brain potentials, rate of brain glucose metabolism, and general health. The book puts the broad-sense heritability of g at .40 to .50 in children, at .60 to .70 in adolescents and young adults, and at nearly .80 in older adults. It argues that shared family influences on g are substantial in childhood, but that in adults the environmental sources of variance are almost exclusively of the within-family kind. The book suggests that the main environmental influence on g is developmental "noise", consisting of more or less random physical events affecting the neurophysiological substrate of mental growth. It reviews the evidence that elementary cognitive tasks (ECTs) are correlated with g. It argues that the ECT research supports the notion that g is related to the speed and efficiency of neural processes.

The book argues that the g factor shows considerable practical validity. It is related to a large number of economically, educationally, and socially valued attributes. It is a particularly good predictor of academic and job-related outcomes. It stresses the difference between g and what it calls vehicles of g. Changes in test scores do not necessarily represent changes in the underlying construct, viz., g. Practice effects on test scores appear to be unrelated to g. An authentic change in g happens when the change shows broad generalizability to a wide variety of cognitive tasks. Intensive psychological interventions beginning in infancy have generally failed to produce lasting effects on g. To what extent the Flynn effect represents a change in g is unknown.

Mainly due to the relation between differences in g and important educational, economic, and social differences, there has long been interest in group differences in g in the United States. The most extensively researched is the gap between white and black Americans. According to the book, whites outscore blacks in the US by about 1.2 standard deviations, or 18 IQ points, on average. Blacks in sub-Saharan Africa score, on average, about two standard deviations below the white mean. The black-white gap in the US is not due to test bias. Cognitive tests have the same reliability and validity for all American-born, English-speaking groups. The magnitude of the black-white gap in the US is best predicted by the test's g loading, implying that the gap is mainly due to a difference in g. Jensen argues that the black-white gap has a biological component. The book contends that the causes of differences in g between blacks and whites consist of the same environmental and genetic differences and in approximately the same magnitudes as within-population differences.

The book argues that the g factor is important because it is a major node in a complex network of educationally, socially and economically important variables ("the g nexus"). The book argues that a person's level of g is a threshold variable, and that above a certain threshold other, non-g abilities and talents, including personality differences, are critical for educational and vocational success. The book anticipated that after 1998, subsequent research on g would have to extend into two directions, "horizontal" and "vertical": horizontal research to identify new variables in the g nexus, and vertical research to uncover the origins of g in terms of evolutionary biology and neurophysiology.

== Reviews ==
The g Factor was reviewed favorably by Canadian psychologist J. Philippe Rushton, who called it "an awesome and monumental exposition of the case for the reality of g." Robert Sternberg was more critical in his review, writing that "there is a great deal of evidence of various kinds that the general factor does not do what Jensen claims." He also acknowledged that "Even those who disagree with most of what Arthur Jensen says in The g Factor, such as myself, have to admire the sheer dedication, pertinacity, and tireless scholarship that must have gone into a work of this scope."
