= Reynolds Intellectual Assessment Scales =

Test of intelligence

The Reynolds Intellectual Assessment Scales (RIAS) is an individually administered test of intelligence that includes a co-normed, supplemental measure of memory. It is appropriate for individuals ages 3–94.

The RIAS intelligence subtests include Verbal Reasoning (verbal), Guess What (verbal), Odd-Item Out (nonverbal), and What's Missing? (nonverbal). Memory subtests include Verbal Memory and Nonverbal Memory. Included within the RIAS is the Reynolds Intellectual Screening Test (RIST), a quick screener that consists of two RIAS subtests (Guess What and Odd-Item Out) and takes less time to complete than the RIAS.

== Editions and uses ==
The test is currently in its second edition, published in 2015.

Both editions are suitable for evaluation of intellectual giftedness, and high scores are accepted as qualifying evidence for high IQ societies such as Intertel (min. IQ ≥ 135) and American Mensa (min. IQ ≥ 130).

== See also ==
- Wide Range Achievement Test
