= Douglas N. Jackson =

Canadian psychologist (1929–2004)

Douglas N. Jackson FRSC
- Born: Douglas Northrop Jackson II; August 14, 1929; Merrick, New York, U.S.
- Died: August 22, 2004 (aged 75); London, Ontario, Canada
- Education: Cornell University (BS); Purdue University (PhD)
- Scientific career
- Fields: Psychometrics
- Workplaces: Pennsylvania State University; Stanford University; University of Western Ontario
- Thesis: Stability in resistance to field forces (1955)
- Doctoral advisor: John M. Hadley

Douglas Northrop Jackson II FRSC (August 14, 1929 – August 22, 2004) was a Canadian psychology professor best known for his work in human assessment and psychological testing.

== Life and career ==
Born in Merrick, New York, Jackson graduated from Cornell University in 1951 with a B.S. in industrial and labor relations and earned his Ph.D. from Purdue University in 1955 in clinical psychology. Jackson taught at Pennsylvania State University (1956–62) and Stanford University (1962–64) before starting at University of Western Ontario in 1964, where he taught for over 32 years.

Jackson created numerous tests in his life, including:

- Multidimensional Aptitude Battery (MAB)
- Personality Research Form (PRF)
- Jackson Vocational Interest Survey (JVIS)
- Employee Screening Questionnaire (ESQ)

These were distributed through two companies he founded, Research Psychologists Press and Sigma Assessment Systems.

Jackson collaborated with Samuel Messick at the Educational Testing Service, examining construct validity. Jackson also published several analyses on sex and intelligence that found males applying to medical schools had a small but nontrivial advantage in general intelligence factor and in reasoning.

Jackson served on the Executive Council of the International Test Commission and was a Fellow of the Royal Society of Canada (1989). He was president of the Society of Multivariate Experimental Research from 1975–1976 and received their Saul Sells Award for Lifetime Contributions in 1997. He was President of APA's Division of Measurement, Evaluation, and Statistics from 1989–1990 and was awarded that division's Samuel J. Messick Award for Distinguished Scientific Contributions in 2004.

In 1994, Jackson was one of 52 signatories on "Mainstream Science on Intelligence," an editorial written by Linda Gottfredson and published in The Wall Street Journal, which declared the consensus of the signing scholars on issues related to the controversy about intelligence research that followed the publication of the book The Bell Curve.

A colleague J. Philippe Rushton noted that Jackson's founding of Canada's Society for Academic Freedom and Scholarship was a response to "Canadian researchers challenged by 'political correctness'" and "demonstrated his personal commitment to ensuring personal liberty and freedom of enquiry for his colleagues."
