= Wide Range Achievement Test =

The Wide Range Achievement Test, currently in its fifth edition (WRAT5), is an achievement test which measures an individual's ability to read words, comprehend sentences, spell, and compute solutions to math problems.

The test is appropriate for individuals aged 5 years through adult. The WRAT5 provides two equivalent forms (Blue and Green), which enables retesting within short periods of time without potential practice effects that occur from repeating the same items. The alternate forms also may be administered together in a single examination.

The test was developed in 1941 by psychologists Sidney W. Bijou and Joseph Jastak. The test series was first published in 1946 and has historically been used in a variety of settings as a measure of the basic academic skills necessary for effective learning, communication, and thinking.

An overall composite score for reading was added with the 4th edition (WRAT4) in 2006; the WRAT5 update in 2017 included refinements to the Math Computation and Sentence Comprehension subtests, while maintaining the same overall structure of the assessment.

== Scoring ==
Norms provided for the 1978 edition include standard scores with a mean of 100 and a standard deviation of 15, percentile scores, and grade levels. The standard scores are scaled based on the norm group; the grade levels are arbitrarily assigned and can be interpreted only as rough references to achievement level. Only standard scores should be used for comparisons among scores.

== Reliability ==
The manual reports split-half reliabilities of .98 for Reading at both levels, .94 for Arithmetic at both levels, .96 for Spelling I, and .97 for Spelling II. During the norming study, both levels of the WRAT were administered to children ages 9 through 14. Since there is overlap in skills tested between the high end of level I and the low end of level II, this provides another estimate of the reliability of both. On Reading and Spelling, split-half reliabilities ranged from .88 to .94 for different age groups; on Arithmetic they ranged from .79 to .89. These results indicate that overall the reliability of the WRAT is excellent

== Validity ==
The test most similar to the WRAT is the Peabody Individual Achievement Test (PIAT), another short, individually administered test which covers comparable material. In general the WRAT correlates very highly with the PIAT. The WRAT correlates moderately with various IQ tests, in the range of .40 to .70 for most groups and most tests.

== Norms ==
The 1978 WRAT norms are based on 15,200 subjects for seven states. According to the manual, no attempt was made to make the sample representative of national characteristics. The manual states that minorities were represented, but gives no data on their representation. The sample was stratified by age, sex, and approximately by ability.

== Suggested uses ==
Recommended uses for the test described in the manual include comparing achievement of one person to another, determining learning ability or learning disability, comparing codes with comprehension in order to prescribe remedial programs, and informally assessing error patterns to plan instructional programs.
