= Gifted pull-out =

Educational approach

Gifted pull-outs (also called send-out or resource programs) are an educational approach in which gifted students are removed (or "pulled-out") from a heterogeneous (mixed-ability) classroom to spend a portion of their time with academic peers. Pull-outs tend to meet one to two hours per week. The students meet with a teacher to engage in enrichment or extension activities that may or may not be related to the curriculum being taught in the regular classroom. Pull-out teachers in some states are not required to have any formal background in gifted education.

== Criticism ==
Research has suggested that there are benefits to grouping gifted children together for the majority of the school day, which suggests that the limited meeting times and durations of gifted pull-out groups may have limited benefits for the gifted children. A 1993 U.S. Government report found up to 72% of school districts using the pull-out approach despite this method being generally unsuccessful. This lack of effectiveness has been echoed in more recent literature. Likewise, Borland (2003) concludes that pull-out programming is generally unproductive. Specifically, this is because pull-outs are composed of a hodge-podge of critical thinking, logic puzzles, and random subjects (like mythology) which are unlikely to result in any significant academic progress because they are not tied directly to the core curriculum. Winebrenner (2001) recommends those same ineffective practices, including creative problem solving, chess, logic puzzles, and academic competitions. Oddly, Winebrenner also recommends that students selected for pull-out should be those who are capable in the areas the pull-out will address. This is exactly the opposite of the approach recommended by most gifted literature, which argues for matching the instruction to the student, not vice versa. Jan and Bob Davidson of the Davidson Institute for Talent Development criticize pull-outs in their book, Genius Denied: How to Stop Wasting Our Brightest Young Minds. On page 47, they say, "Most pull-out programs provide little beyond a creative outlet--and since districts that offer such programs claim they are helping gifted children when they aren't, they are often worse than no programs at all." Matthews and Foster also criticize pull-out gifted classes. They claim that the learning needs of advanced students are too important to be restricted to the day(s) on which their gifted class is scheduled. Furthermore, as they also point out, students can be penalized for missing their regular class (for example, by missing a class field trip), and sometimes teachers resent the pull-out teacher taking the strongest students out of their class. And perhaps most worrisome, the work in withdrawal gifted classes is often not differentiated for learning needs or properly integrated into children’s other studies. However, pull-out programs, when properly implemented, can be used to complement cluster grouping and other in-class differentiation.

== Success Factors/Recommendations ==
- The content covered in gifted pull-outs may be academically beyond the ability of the students' regular classmates. If other students could do the work, they should be allowed to participate.
- The regular class should be informed that pull-out participation does not make another student a better person. Similarly, participants should be discouraged from bragging.
- Regular classroom teachers should not schedule tests, special events, or new topics during the pull-out. Pull-out students can prove their mastery of the regular classroom material by answering a small subset of the problems containing the most challenging material.
- A single, larger block of time is preferable to two or more smaller blocks.
- The gifted specialist needs time to communicate with other teachers to map the extension and enrichment work to the core curriculum. Research shows that such systematic extension can result in substantial academic gains. Similar gains in critical and creative thinking can be made in annual programs for those topics.
- A 90-minute one-size-fits-all solution for every gifted child is inappropriate. Pull-outs must be part of a larger context including in-class differentiation, independent study, subject and whole-grade acceleration (grade skipping), distance learning, dual enrollment, AP courses, and mentorship. The gifted specialist should work with the regular classroom teacher to design these accommodations.
- Pull-outs should encourage struggling to learn, facing challenges, and learning from mistakes,
- Assigning pull-out homework can be advantageous, but is not necessary.
- Pull-outs are an effective venue for working on social and emotional issues and interpersonal skill deficits encountered by gifted children.
- Pull-outs are generally more successful in elementary school because middle and high school scheduling becomes problematic and the higher grades typically offer more options for advanced work and extracurriculars than the lower grades.

== Difficulties ==
- Pull-outs may be perceived erroneously by parents, teachers, and administrators as the entire solution to gifted education, while they should actually play a supplementary role to daily differentiated work in the regular classroom.
- Children are often expected to make up work that was missed during pull-out, which frequently is not challenging to them to begin with.
- Communication with the regular classroom teacher can break down, and oftentimes, does.
- Regular educators may resent the program.
- The pull-out curriculum may be viewed as fluff, and unjustifiably so.
- Regular educators may resent the missing of important classwork.
- Regular educators may feel that they themselves could easily teach the program and, therefore, resent the gifted exceptionality.

== See also ==
- Academic acceleration
- Cluster grouping
- Differentiated instruction
- A Nation Deceived: How Schools Hold Back America's Brightest Students
