= Grade skipping =

Form of academic acceleration

Grade skipping is a form of academic acceleration, often used for academically talented students, that enables the student to skip entirely the curriculum of one or more years of school. Grade skipping allows students to learn at an appropriate level for their cognitive abilities, and is normally seen in schools that group students primarily according to their chronological age, rather than by their individual developmental levels. Grade skipping is usually done when a student is sufficiently advanced in all school subjects, so that they can move forward in all subjects or graduate, rather than in only one or two areas. There are alternatives to grade skipping.

== Timing and other factors ==
Grade acceleration is easiest to implement through an early start to school by either entering pre-kindergarten a year early or skipping pre-kindergarten into kindergarten directly. By starting the child ahead, many of the problems associated with grade skipping, such as leaving friends behind or knowledge gaps, are avoided.

Other key factors to a successful grade skip include the desire of the student and the receptivity of the receiving teacher. All these factors have been studied and organized into a survey called The Iowa Acceleration Scale (IAS), which when completed yields a recommendation on whether or not to accelerate an individual student. The IAS also cited four critical situations in which grade skipping is not recommended. These conditions can include:

1. If the learner scored less than 115 on an intelligence test;
2. If the learner is moved up into the same grade as an older sibling, which could lead to sibling rivalry;
3. If the learner is currently within the same grade as a sibling; and,
4. If the learner does not want to be grade skipped.

== Cost-effectiveness ==
Grade skipping is one of the most cost-effective ways of addressing the needs of a profoundly gifted student, as it requires no extra resources and little more than assigning the child to a different classroom, without the expense of special materials, tutoring, or separate programs. The cost of educating the gifted child in a regular classroom with typical same-age peers is the same as the cost of educating that child in a regular classroom with typical somewhat older students, so grade skipping is essentially cost-free to the school.

== Potential problems ==
There are many common objections to grade skipping. Common issues raised are that students are often harmed by being placed in an environment for which they are academically ready but emotionally or socially not and that some students may end up with knowledge gaps compared to their peers if not properly prepared.

=== Knowledge gaps ===
The time that the student skips may create a knowledge gap if the child has not self-studied the material already taught to the students in the grade being entered. While the student is bridging this gap they will likely find the new material challenging. It may be demoralizing to leave a situation in which they are top performers into a situation where they are struggling with the material.

=== Social concerns ===
Unless the skipped students are already in a multi-grade class, students entering a new grade after being in school are usually taken out of their existing classes and put into new classes, with different students. Similar to what happens to students who change schools due to moving to a new home, spending less time with former classmates may disrupt some social ties, and there may be a period of stress while the students integrate into their new classes. Although this change is perceived as a potential problem by adults who think it is normal for children to only have friends of exactly the same age, many gifted children find it easier to make friends with children their age.

== Alternatives ==
Alternatives to grade skipping include:

- Ability grouping – Putting students in small groups according to their achievement, while staying in the same class. For example, a small group of young students may be taught reading skills above their official grade level.
- Ungraded school – A school system that rejects age-based grade levels and teaches students in mixed-age classes, based on their individual achievement in each separate subject. For example, a class that teaches writing at what would normally be considered a second-grade level might have students of any age, including young students who are already skilled in writing, age-typical students, and older students who are still developing their writing skills. During the next teaching period, a different group of students would assemble for another subject.
- Advanced class – Used for a student who is notably advanced in a single subject. This involves changing a student's class assignment for that single subject. For example, an eighth-grade student might take a math class with ninth graders, but the rest of the student's classes are with the age-typical peers.
- Enrichment programs – Instead of accelerating faster, the student joins a program that enriches the standard curriculum by going deeper or adding extra projects.

== See also ==
- Early entrance to college
- Reclassification (education), graduating high school early, often after repeating a grade
- Redshirting (academic) – postponing the start of school, for children who are socially or academically less prepared for kindergarten
