= Decoding Genius =

Technology and entrepreneur podcast

Creative team
- Created by: GE

Cast and voices
- Hosted by: Lily Serna

Publication
- No. of seasons: 1
- No. of episodes: 6
- Original release: 26 October – 1 December 2016

Decoding Genius was a six-part podcast series investigating the stories of six young geniuses changing the world in their respective fields. It was hosted by Australian mathematician Lily Serna, and also featured experts in intelligence. The series was produced by MADE, in collaboration with Macquarie Media for Fairfax and GE. It launched on 26 October 2016.

== Reception ==
Decoding Genius secured over 142,000 downloads. In the first week of launch, it was ranked in the Apple Store’s top ten podcasts. It was also the #1 podcast in the iTunes Arts category during its release.

The series won an INMA (International News Media Association) Global Media Award.

The Australian Audio Guide described the series as being "bright-sounding and snappily produced".

== Episodes ==
Episode number	Title	Air date	Genius	Invention, discovery, or other note	Experts
1	Spotting Genius: The Genius – Born or Bred?	26 October 2016	Kelcie Miller-Anderson, USA	A method for bringing polluted soils back to life	Miraca Gross, Otto Siegel
2	Getting the ‘lightbulb’ to turn on	2 November 2016	Maya Burhanpurkar, Canada	An antibiotic that kills pathogenic bacteria	Stephen Hsu, Kirsten Baulch
3	The turning point: Rising to the challenge	10 November 2016	Mitchell Clark, Australia	Cybersecurity company (at the age of 10)	Colleen Harsin (the Davidson Academy)
4	The 99%: Genius + Hard Work = Extraordinary Results	17 November 2016	Jordan Nguyen, Australia	A mind-controlled wheelchair	Michele Juratowitch, Rick Beato (Nuryl), Karen King
5	The magic of Genius: What science can’t explain	24 November 2016	Josh and Zac Tiessen, Canada	Child prodigies: "Josh is acknowledged as one of the world’s masters of modern realism, and Zac is a brilliant guitarist."	Joanne Ruthsatz, Daniel Kilov
6	The future of Genius: Watch this space	1 December 2016	Ivan Zelich, Australia	The Liang-Zelich Theorem	Alan D. Thompson, Michele Juratowitch

== Decoding Industry ==
In April 2017, a spinoff live event was hosted, focusing on digital disruption, future skills, and how Australia must leverage technology for future prosperity. A podcast series was released in June 2017, with several episodes created from the live event.
