= Davidson Academy =

Davidson Academy may refer to:

- Davidson Academy (Reno, Nevada), a public school for gifted students in Reno, Nevada
- Davidson Academy (Tennessee), a private, co-educational school in Nashville, Tennessee
- Davidson Academy in Tullahoma, Tennessee, a school dor African Americans that closed after integration and became a community center
