= Cluster grouping =

Ability-grouping strategy in education

Cluster grouping is an educational process in which four to six gifted and talented (GT) or high-achieving students or both are assigned to an otherwise heterogeneous classroom within their grade to be instructed by a teacher who has had specialized training in differentiating for gifted learners. Clustering can be contrasted with other ability-grouping strategies in which high achievers fill their own dedicated class, entirely separate from other students.

Cluster grouping is not experimental as it has been used successfully since 1974. While no single practice is a panacea for gifted instruction, Schuler's national survey showed a 99% positive approval rating among parents of clustered children and a 90% positive approval rating among the children themselves. Over two-thirds of administrators had a similar positive experience.

Although typically implemented in the upper elementary grades (3-6), cluster grouping has been used in grades K through 12. The methods for selecting children for cluster groups are usually similar to those for other gifted and talented services. Several instructional options are typically used within a cluster, including: enrichment and extensions, higher-order thinking skills, pretesting and differentiation, compacting, an accelerated pace, and more complex content."Through cluster grouping the intellectual, social, and emotional needs of the gifted students can be addressed."

For clustering to be effective, the teacher must be motivated to work with gifted children and receive specialized training, the curriculum for the cluster must be appropriately differentiated, and the remainder of the class cannot contain difficult or demanding students. Other anecdotal success factors for teachers include: fostering the valuing and acceptance of differences within the classroom, allowing pretesting and credit for previously mastered material, designing independent study that utilizes student passion, remaining flexible in teaching style, and maintaining a sense of humor.

== Advantages ==
There is strong research evidence supporting the tutorial benefits of clustering gifted students during a single classroom. Rogers, Karen B, Ph.D., Re-forming Gifted Education (Great Potential Press, Scottsdale, AZ, 2002), pp. 249. consistent with one survey, advantages include: cost effectiveness, high challenge and expectations of scholars, faster progression through curricula, administrative ease in observation of services, increased understanding of GT students, and an improved opportunity to deal with the psychological needs of the GT students. Schuler also, children with subject-specific giftedness, who might rather be exclude from gifted pull-outs, are often placed within the cluster classroom to require part in advanced work when appropriate. Winebrenner, pp. 177–178. Some research has shown that clustering grouping produces positive academic results for all children within the cluster classroom.

== Concerns and criticism ==
Cluster grouping has experienced some negative reception. Teachers in schools that did not limit the extremes with the cluster classroom have expressed frustration at the required range of instruction. For this reason, Winebrenner recommends that the cluster classroom teacher not also have the neediest students. Some educators may become resentful if not selected as the cluster teacher. For fairness, the responsibility and opportunity of cluster grouping can be cycled in two-year terms through faculty members who are interested and have been trained in its use.

Administrators have at times resented special grouping, expressed frustration regarding scheduling, and have simply been biased against any programming for GT children. Difficulty can arise in placing gifted students who have recently moved into the school district.

Cluster grouping has been accused of denying academic leadership to other classes, but experience has proven otherwise. When gifted students are grouped for instruction, new leadership emerges among the remaining students. Clusters larger than six students have been criticized as unwieldy. In these cases, Winebrenner recommends splitting the group into two separate classrooms.

Parents may apply pressure for their children to be placed within the cluster classroom even if their child does not qualify for the cluster group and there is no research evidence of an inspirational effect. To address this problem, schools can ensure that all staff are trained in differentiation and that all non-GT students are cycled into a cluster classroom at an equal rate over the entirety of their school years.

== Comparison to tracking, pull-outs, and mixed-ability groups ==
A comprehensive study of grouping by Rogers states, "Students who are academically or intellectually gifted and talented should spend the majority of their school day with others of similar abilities and interests." Magnet schools, schools within a school, and classrooms composed entirely of gifted students may not be appropriate in all districts. In these situations, the study goes on to state, "The Cluster Grouping of a small number of students, either intellectually gifted or gifted in a similar academic domain, within an otherwise heterogeneously grouped classroom can be considered when schools cannot support a full-time gifted program (either demographically, economically, or philosophically)."

Cluster grouping is distinct from tracking in that tracking organizes entire classrooms by ability, and little mobility exists between tracks as students progress through school. Conversely, cluster groups tend to expand over time rather than remain fixed.

While cluster groups allow GT children to spend the majority of their day with academic peers as recommended by research, pull-outs (also called "send-out" or "resource" programs) tend to meet one to two hours per week. A 1993 U.S. Government report found up to 72% of school districts using the pull-out approach despite this method being generally unsuccessful. This lack of effectiveness has been echoed in more recent literature as well. Specifically, this is because pull-outs are often a hodgepodge of critical thinking, logic puzzles, and random subjects (e.g., mythology) which are unlikely to result in any significant academic progress because they are not tied directly to the core curriculum. However, properly-implemented pull-out programs can be used to complement cluster grouping.

Finally, mixed-ability grouping does not provide academic benefit to gifted children, and it can result in alienation and isolation of GT students. In mixed ability group projects, gifted children frequently do most of the work or teach the other children, which is not their responsibility and for which they have no certification.

== See also ==
- Gifted education
- Intellectual giftedness
- A Nation Deceived
