= Multi-age classroom =

Classroom with students from more than one grade level

Multi-age classrooms or composite classes are classrooms with students from more than one grade level. They are created because of the pedagogical choice of a school or school district. They are different from split classes which are formed when there are too many students for one class – but not enough to form two classes of the same grade level. Composite classes are more common in smaller schools; an extreme form is the one-room school.

Studies of the performance of students in composite classes show their academic performance is not substantially different from those in single-grade classrooms; instead, outcomes tend to be a function of the teacher's performance.

== History and prevalence ==
Multi-age schooling originated in one-room schoolhouses during the 19th century. It became less common in the 20th century with the rise of mainstream schooling. However, multi-age schooling had a resurgence in the 1960s. Approximately one-third of all classes across the world are multigrade classes. (Kelly, 2015)

The reasoning behind multi-age classrooms is distinct from that of split classes. While split classes are created when there are not enough students to form two separate single-age classes, multi-age classes are intentionally formed to create a mixed-age, diverse learning environment. This is an important distinction, as the reason for creating a split class or multi-age class will dictate what kinds of teaching strategies and pedagogy are applied in the classroom, which will in turn impact student outcomes.

For a given number of students, composite classes allow greater administrative flexibility in allocating students to classes. This allows gender balancing, matching of student needs to teaching expertise, and balancing class sizes. By allocating children to classes according to specific learning needs, it is possible to arrange classes with narrower ranges of abilities.

Schools composed exclusively of composite classes are increasingly common in Australian primary school education; they are not uncommon in New Zealand.

Composite classes often meet resistance, with parents often believing that their child is disadvantaged by being in one. This perception is often regardless of whether their child would be in the younger or older cohort.

Advocates of multi-age classrooms point to the lack of age stratification in workplaces, families, or other social environments as a reason to create a similar environment in the classroom.

== Cited benefits ==
Social benefits often cited are:

- Older children in a composite class get more leadership opportunities and frequently build self-esteem as a sort of role model to their younger classmates. Younger children aspire to do work like the older children in the class.
- The ability for a child to be educated by one teacher for two years, creating a stronger relationship.
- This mixed-age structure allows younger children to learn from their older peers, which accelerates their cognitive and social development.

Educational benefits often cited are:

- Because literacy and numeracy are taught in ability groups, teachers need heightened awareness of individual student's capabilities – they must think of children as individuals.
- The techniques of classroom teaching and individual teaching can be still applied.
- Learning by teaching occurs when students at different stages of learning can help each other with their work; children resolve differences in understanding of the material.
- Research indicates that multi-age classrooms play a substantial role in the development of language skills, particularly among younger students.
- Composite classes provide a range of levels of work, so the needs of both talented children and slower learners can be catered for while providing a supportive environment for both.

At any one time, both composite and single-level classes have groups of students at a variety of levels. This is part of the normal delivery of the curriculum. Education expectations are set at curriculum levels which span across two years; for example, see the Victorian Essential Learning Standards. Contemporary teaching and learning materials are developed for multi-age classes. By using them, teachers can introduce core concepts to the whole classroom, and then differentiate instruction for the range of learners in the classroom.

=== Other considerations ===
The students will be of a greater range of size, age, and maturity which can have both positive and negative implications, particularly in class sporting activities and playground interaction.

== Opposition to multiage classrooms and criticism ==
Opponents of multiage classrooms argue that most parents would rather have their children in a single-grade classroom rather than a multi-grade classroom, believing that their children will benefit from learning with peers of the same age. Some parents worry that their children may not receive the same level of attention or progress in a multiage setting compared to a single-grade classroom. They also argue that students in the upper grades of a composite class learn the same material they were taught in the lower grades. In contrast, talented children may find the work too easy since they have already learned it. However, slower learners or students who failed the curriculum or a certain subject may have been placed in a composite class to catch up to the curriculum or become more proficient in a subject.

It is also pointed out that multiage classes tend to be larger than single-grade classes. Teachers must also assess their students to determine whether they should be moved to a different group. Some teachers are not trained to teach combo classes. Effective multiage teaching requires specific skills and training that not all teachers possess. This can lead to inconsistent teaching quality. Discipline can also be difficult, considering students' age ranges and maturity levels in a combo class. While peer learning can be beneficial, it can also lead to social challenges, such as bullying or the exclusion of younger students, who might feel overwhelmed or intimidated by older classmates. Plus, not only do they create more work for teachers (as multiage classrooms may require additional teaching staff and materials to meet diverse student needs), but school administrators may also have to rethink schedules, staffing, and communication with parents. This requires more planning and individualized instruction. Critics also argue that multiage classrooms can make it difficult to follow a standardized curriculum, as teachers need to tailor lessons to a wide range of abilities. Standardized testing, which is often grade-specific, can be challenging to implement in multiage settings.

== See also ==
- Age segregation in schools
- Class-size reduction
- One-room school
- Sudbury schools, schools that are completely age-mixed from age four through high school. No age-groupings.
- Ungraded school, a school that does not formally organize students according to age-based grade levels.
