= A Nation Deceived =

2004 report arguing for academic acceleration

A Nation Deceived: How Schools Hold Back America's Brightest Students is The Templeton National Report on Acceleration, a report which was published in 2004 and edited by Nicholas Colangelo, Susan G. Assouline, and Miraca Gross. This report argues for the academic acceleration of qualified gifted and talented students, based on the results of studies on outcomes of accelerating and not accelerating high-achieving students. Despite the evidence that acceleration is a beneficial practice when implemented correctly, many teachers and parents are reluctant to accelerate students. The report presents the research on acceleration in an effort to increase the number of students who have access to acceleration.

The report is divided into two parts: Volume I, which summarizes the research and provides an introduction to acceleration as an academic intervention for gifted students; and Volume II, an edited volume that provides a more detailed overview of relevant research studies.

The success of A Nation Deceived led to the creation of the Acceleration Institute (formerly the Institute for Research and Policy on Acceleration), which is dedicated to the study and support of educational acceleration for academically talented students.

A Nation Empowered, a follow-up to A Nation Deceived, was published in 2015. It expands upon findings of the original report and incorporates research that has emerged since publication of A Nation Deceived.

== Contents ==
The first three of its "20 Most Important Points from Volume II" are:

1. Acceleration is the most effective curriculum intervention for gifted children.
2. For bright students, acceleration has long-term beneficial effects, both academically and socially.
3. Acceleration, especially in the form of grade skipping, is a virtually cost-free intervention.

Among other points, the report also indicates that:

- Gifted students are frequently better matched with their cognitive peers (older peers) rather than age peers.
- Above-level testing is useful in identifying candidates for acceleration. Above-level testing is defined as testing that is two or more grade levels above a student's current placement. For example, a fourth grader might take a test intended for sixth graders. Above-level testing helps eliminate the ceiling effect that often makes it difficult to determine appropriate placement for high-ability students.
- Early entry to kindergarten benefits some gifted children both academically and socially.
- Skipping two or more years of school is academically and socially beneficial for highly gifted students.
- Although significant evidence for the validity of acceleration exists, many educators remain negative about the practice.

== See also ==
- Marland report
- A Nation at Risk
- Hothousing
