= Davidson Institute =

American nonprofit organisation

- Formation: 1999
- Type: Nonprofit
- Purpose: Supports profoundly gifted children
- Co-founders: Bob & Jan Davidson
- Key people: Aim Cummins (Co-Executive Director); Katie Glensor (Co-Executive Director)
- Website: https://www.davidsongifted.org/

The Davidson Institute is an American nonprofit organization established by former educational software entrepreneurs, Bob and Jan Davidson. The organization's mission is to support the needs of profoundly gifted children through information resources, networking and educational opportunities, family support, advocacy, summer programs and scholarships.

== Background ==
After selling the successful software company Davidson & Associates in 1997, founders Bob and Jan Davidson's focus shifted to philanthropy, with the intent of helping America's brightest young students. Deciding that gifted students are arguably the most under-served and neglected in America’s educational system, this led to them establishing the Davidson Institute for Talent Development in 1999.

== Programs ==
=== Davidson Young Scholars ===
The Davidson Young Scholars is designed to support the educational and developmental needs of profoundly intelligent young people between the ages of 5 and 18 in the United States. This program also seeks to assist parents and students with academic support and educational advocacy, child and adolescent development, and talent development. There are more than 4,000 students in the Young Scholars program.

=== THINK Summer Institute ===
The THINK Summer Institute is a three-week residential summer program on the campus of the University of Nevada, Reno, for profoundly gifted 13- to 16-year-old students. Attendees are given the opportunity to earn college credits. Since the inaugural year of THINK (2004), up to 60 students now attend the program each summer.

=== The Davidson Academy ===
The Davidson Academy (Reno, Nevada) was created following state legislation in 2005 that designated it as a “university school for profoundly gifted pupils.” The Davidsons decided to create the Academy as an outgrowth of the Davidson Young Scholars program and THINK Summer Institute, upon learning of the interest shown by many parents. The Academy offers two educational options - an Online campus for students living anywhere in the United States and a Reno day school located on the campus of the University of Nevada, Reno, for local students.

In the Academy's inaugural year (2006–2007), 35 students were enrolled. In 2018, 155 students were enrolled at the Reno day school and 34 through the online campus.

In 2017-2018, the Academy launched an online option for profoundly gifted students living anywhere in the United States.

In 2025-2026 U.S. News & World Report ranked the school #4 in the top 10 public high schools in the United States.

=== Davidson Fellows ===
The Davidson Fellows Scholarship recognizes young people under the age of 18 who have completed an original, significant piece of work with the potential to make a positive contribution to society in science, technology, mathematics, music, literature, philosophy or a category called "Outside the Box."

Davidson Fellow Laureates are awarded $50,000 scholarships, and Davidson Fellows are awarded either a $25,000 or $10,000 scholarship. Since the scholarship began in 2001, 469 students have been awarded more than $10.7 million.

=== Educators Guild ===
The Davidson Institute's Educators Guild is a free online community for teachers, counselors and school administrators.

=== Davidson Gifted Database ===
The Davidson Gifted Database provides numerous resources for and about gifted students. The database features search capabilities for articles and resources, as well as state policy pages featuring information specific to each state.

=== Genius Denied ===
Co-authored by the Davidsons with Laura Vanderkam in 2004, Genius Denied: How to Stop Wasting our Bright Young Minds narrates the frustrations and successes often experienced by gifted students and their parents. The book, published by Simon & Schuster, describes how the needs of the brightest students in America often are not met, as the focus has shifted to underperforming students in recent times. It also provides parents tips on how to help their gifted children and advocate on their behalf.

== See also ==
- Davidson Academy of Nevada
- Davidson & Associates
- Gifted Pull-out
