= Age segregation in schools =

Age segregation in schools, age grading, or graded education is the separation of students into years of education (grades, forms) by approximately the same age. It is based on the theory that learners of the same age at the same level of social and intellectual maturity should be taught at the same pace. Here, schools classify learners according to age cohorts with the expectation that those with similar age share needs, abilities, and interests. It also forms part of the standardized learning organized in stages and progresses in predictable and known ways.

== History ==
The concept of age-segregated school is considered a recent historical development, with scholars noting that during the late eighteenth century students of widely varying ages in many European countries attend school together, a practice that was also adopted in the United States. In colonial America, it was customary to teach students of various ages in one classroom by one teacher. The graded education was only introduced from 1848 to 1870 after several American educators such as Horace Mann were impressed and, thereafter, adopted the Prussian graded school model. The first American graded school was the Quincy Grammar School in Boston, Massachusetts.

Age grading in schools has significant impact on age segregation among adolescent peer groups.

== See also ==
- Multi-age classroom
- Ungraded school
- Sudbury schools, schools that are completely age-mixed from age 4 through high school. No age-groupings.
- Single-sex education
- Mixed-sex education
