= Ungraded school =

An ungraded school is a school that does not formally organize students according to age-based grade levels. Students' achievements are assessed by teachers, and each student is individually assigned to one of several fluid groups, according to what the student needs to learn next.

Typically, skills and knowledge are divided up into smaller pieces, rather than a year's worth of material. Students continue studying a given skill until they have learned it. For example, when a child has mastered the given level of subtraction skills, then they may be sent to a group that is learning beginning multiplication skills. Major skill areas are assessed separately, so prowess or weakness in one area does not force the student into an inappropriate level in other areas.

Because of the flexibility, learning at faster or slower pace than average does not leave overachievers bored and neglected, or force slower students or students whose home life has been disrupted through trauma, divorce or serious illness to repeat whole years to pick up individual skills.

By eliminating grade levels, pressure for grade retention, social promotion, and grade skipping is eliminated.

== History ==
Graded schools being largely an invention of the 19th century, the small, ungraded school could be properly considered traditional education, although they are rare enough now that they are usually classified as alternative education. Ungraded schools still persist in poor, ethnically disadvantaged, small, rural schools, where the limited number of students and poor attendance make organizing classrooms according to age-based grade levels more complicated.

== Current examples ==
=== Sudbury Schools ===
Since being established in 1968, Sudbury Valley School, and other Sudbury Schools using the same education model, are ungraded schools for students aged 4 through 18. Further, complete age-mixing of students is considered an integral part of the school environment and culture.

== Logistics ==
Although most teachers use ability grouping on a small scale, assigning students to the correct group for every subject can be logistically challenging. Group sizes may vary significantly from week to week as students are promoted or need to repeat material at different rates.

== See also ==
- Age segregation in schools
- Multi-age classroom
- One-room school, which were often ungraded schools
- Sudbury school, current education model for ages 4 through 18 without grades
