= Ability grouping =

Practice of grouping students by levels of educational achievement

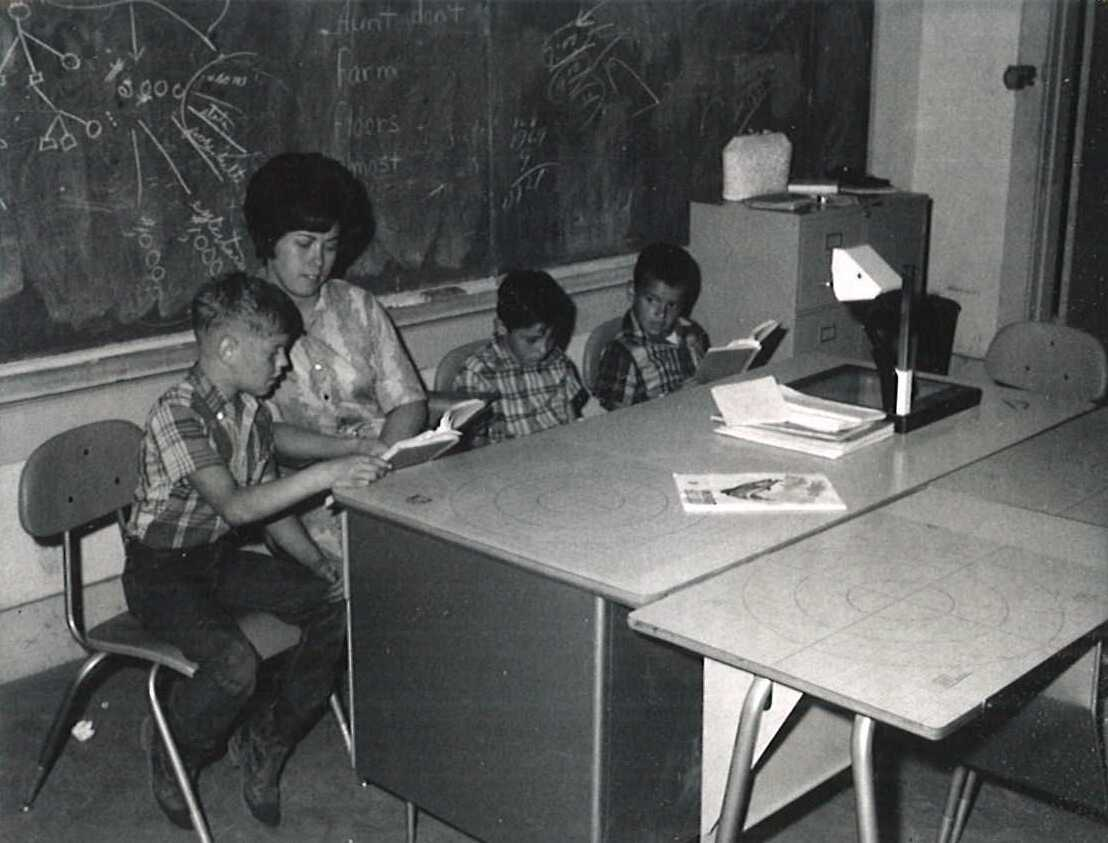
Ability grouping is often used while teaching basic reading skills.

Ability grouping is the educational practice of grouping students by potential or past achievement for a relevant activity. Ability groups are usually small, informal groups formed within a single classroom. It differs from tracking by being less pervasive, involving much smaller groups, and by being more flexible and informal.

In a mixed-ability classroom, ability groups allow the teacher to target review, direct instruction, and advanced work to the needs of a small group, rather than attempting to meet the divergent needs of the entire class simultaneously.

== Practice ==
Assignment to an ability group is often short-term (never lasting longer than one school year), and varies by subject. Assignment to an ability group is made by (and can be changed at any time by) the individual teacher, and is usually not recorded in student records. For example, a teacher may divide a typical mixed-ability classroom into three groups for a mathematics lesson: those who need to review basic facts before proceeding with today's lesson, those who are ready to learn new material, and those who need a challenging assignment. For the next lesson, the teacher may revert to whole-class, mixed-ability instruction, or may assign students to different groups. Such grouping may be very fluid and temporary, such as when elementary reading teachers place children into small reading groups whose members may change several times throughout the school year.

== Contrasted with tracking ==
Ability grouping is not synonymous with tracking. Tracking differs from ability grouping by scale, permanence, and what students learn.

While a teacher could easily move an individual student from the "red table" to "blue table" ability group, tracking is a formal designation that often persists throughout a students' entire school career. In a tracking system, the entire student population is assigned to different classes, or even to different schools, according to their perceived academic potential. Tracked students attend all classes only with students whose overall academic achievement is the same as their own. Among younger students, a tracked school may teach the same underlying subjects, such as reading and mathematics, in different styles, speeds, or depth. Among older students, the students in different tracks are usually given the opportunity to learn only subjects that are deemed appropriate for their track. For example, a student in a "university" track is usually not permitted to study blue-collar vocational skills like welding.

Homogeneous grouping refers to grouping students solely with their academic peers, while heterogeneous grouping means that students are grouped with others of varying ability. Ability grouping can occur in either a heterogeneous or homogeneous classroom.

== Social effects ==
Social stigma can be reduced by giving groups neutral names (e.g., colors, rather than "advanced group" or "remedial group"). Flexible group assignment and regular re-assignments reduces stigma.

== Application to high-ability students ==
Rogers (2002) identifies the following as the most frequent forms of grouping for high-ability students:

- Whole class strategies:
  - Full-time ability classes or tracks. These include special schools for the gifted, full-time gifted programs or classes, and the school-within-a-school approach.
  - Untracked whole class instruction, the most common whole-class approach when others on this list are not utilized.
- Small group strategies:
  - Gifted pull-outs
  - Cluster grouping
  - Subject-based ability grouping
  - Within-class ability grouping
  - Like-ability cooperative grouping
  - Cross-grade grouping by achievement level
  - Peer-tutoring dyads
  - Mixed-ability cooperative grouping, the most small common group approach when others on this list are not utilized

== See also ==
- Ungraded school, entire schools organized around ability grouping
