= Rationale for gifted programs =

Aspect of pediatric psychology

When children are young, schools begin to analyze the youngsters’ abilities and sort them into clusters based on their predicted success. The system labels the cream of the crop as gifted. Clark (2002) defines giftedness as “only a label that society gives to those who have actualized their ability to an unusually high degree or give evidence that such achievement is imminent”. The American government defines giftedness as “students, children or youth who give evidence of high performance capability in areas such as intellectual, creative, artistic, or leadership capacity, or in specific academic fields, and who require services or activities not ordinarily provided by the school in order to fully develop such capabilities” (Clark, 2002). Gifted students learn in a different manner and at an accelerated rate compared to their peers in the classroom and therefore require gifted programs to develop and apply their talents.

Gifted children need outside instruction and development opportunities to expand their minds and become most useful to society and themselves. In a list of reasons compiled in Fostering Academic Excellence, McLeod and Cropley (1989) describe the specific advantages to placing gifted children in adequate programs:

1. “Gifted children are a resource”; here the need for inventive and intelligent minds who will improve the quality of life and advance in the new technological age is stated.
2. “The gifted deserve special treatment corresponding to that received by the handicapped;” the gifted ought to have the same financial support that is given to other groups that are far from the “norm”.
3. “Gifted children need adequate stimulation;” a debate is raised between the incentive that gifted children gain by being in an isolated class of the top five-percent and the argument that normal and slow children would benefit from being mixed in with giftedness.
4. “Special provision for the gifted will prevent dropouts, underachievement and delinquency;” gifted children may lose their zest for school when kept back from learning at their own pace and may almost strive to achieve “normality” to “have a quiet life in school”. (McLeod & Cropley, 1989).

Not only is it important to give the gifted the extra push which is beneficial to society, those students’ minds also operate in a unique way and require a different style of teaching. “The intellectually adept think and learn differently from others…it is important to teach them appropriately” (Freeman et al., 1999). As Merenheimo is quoted in the Journal of Biological Education, “gifted pupils have an analytic strategy of perceiving information. The less gifted use either atomistic or serialistic strategies” (Freeman et al., 1999). Gifted children were also found to be more ambitious—both in the difficulty and effort put into the task—in their schoolwork than others their age. (Freeman et al., 1999).

Schools should bear some responsibility to nurture the talents of the gifted students in their charge. “It is clear from the evidence that excellence does not emerge without appropriate help…. To reach an exceptionally high standard in any area, potentially gifted children need the means to learn; this includes the material to work with and focused, challenging tuition, sometimes including tutoring or mentoring that is not provided in normal schools” (Freeman et al., 1999). Two methods mentioned by Freeman that schools use in the teaching of gifted children are: 1. Accelerating the learning of children, either by moving them up to an older age-group or compacting the material they have to learn, and 2. Enrichment, rounding out, and deepening the material to be learned (Freeman et al., 1999).

== Classroom guidelines for teaching the gifted ==
- “To be at their most effective, pupils can be helped to identify their own ways of learning, which will include strategies of planning, monitoring, evaluation, and choice of what to learn. They should also be helped to be aware of their attitudes to the area to be learned, such as curiosity, persistence, and confidence.” (Freeman et al., 1999).
- “All the evidence indicates that specific provision within subject areas is by far the most effective in promoting talent, rather than general enrichment without identified goals.” (Freeman et al., 1999)
- “Meaningful curriculum experiences for gifted learners need to be carefully planned, written down, implemented, and evaluated in order to maximize potential effect.” (Van Tassel-Baska, 2000)
- Giftedness “can be furthered only by participation in learning experiences that challenge and extend from the point of the child’s talent, ability, and interest” (Clark, 2002).

Gifted students may not reach their full potential with the standards of regular classwork, which can appear to progress at a slowed rate. They may become isolated from their peers on a social level, since intellectual pursuit for the sake of itself is their primary motivation. These students may receive the desired enrichment when put among other high achievers via accelerated coursework and by allowing them to develop their own ideas and viewpoints. Programs tailored for gifted students can cultivate an environment conducive to their success.

== Difficulties with socialization ==
A common myth concerning gifted youth in regular classrooms is that the gifted are a great asset to other students and, through their brilliance, help those of normal intelligence to become better students. According to the National Association for Gifted Children, the self-confidence of normal students is not heightened by the presence of a brilliant young mind. Conversely, historical examples of jealousy and spite toward gifted students have been noted by writers. Leonard Mlodinow recounts of Isaac Newton's school years that "being different and clearly intellectually superior brought Newton the same reaction then as it would today—the other kids hated him."

An additional concern is that gifted children who are pulled from their traditional grade level classroom for enrichment education will fail to strive in their social relationships. It has been shown, however, that students who participate in either in-class or pull-out programs that are at least mostly meeting the academic needs of the student, will tend to form strong relationships with their peers, be well-rounded students, and act an age that is appropriate for their own wellness. In fact, studies have shown that gifted students, whether lowly gifted, moderately gifted, or highly gifted “were, on a whole, socially well adjusted, and there seemed to be no relation between increased intelligence and social adjustment”. Students who are allowed to meet their academic needs, at any level, tend to be more secure and confident in their social needs and in turn form more significant relationships with their age peers. While many link a child's social growth with their academic growth and assume that one must suffer in order for the other to prosper, this has been statistically shown to not be the case.

== Assessment ==
So now that the necessity of these gifted programs have been established, how then do schools and talent search programs identify who meet the criteria for being gifted? National Excellence: A Case for Developing America's Talent suggests that the following guidelines be used (Clark, 2002):

1. Look at a variety of disciplines for outstanding students.
2. Use a variety of tests and other assessment measures to find and serve students who express high levels of ability in different ways and at different ages.
3. Ensure that all students have equal access to challenging learning opportunities and unbiased assessment.
4. Develop assessment procedures that allow varying rates of maturity and interests.
5. Seek students whose potential evidences itself in diverse and less obvious ways.
6. Consider motivational factors such as interest, drive, and passion in assessing accomplishment.

There are six areas of ability which are often evaluated in order to determine whether or not a child is gifted: generic, cognitive, academic, creative, leadership, and visual and performing arts. They are measured in combinations of standardized tests, peer and teacher evaluations and nominations, and observations of the particular child. As for the legitimacy of these methods, Olszewski-Kubilius assures us that “the available research evidence suggests that these practices are valid” (Olszewski-Kubilius et al., 1998).

== See also ==
- Aptitude
- Child prodigy
- Gifted education
- List of gifted and talented programmes
- Multipotentiality
- Positive Disintegration
