= A Nation Empowered =

A Nation Empowered: Evidence Trumps the Excuses Holding Back America's Brightest Students is a follow-up to the 2004 report A Nation Deceived. A Nation Empowered is a national, research-based report on utilizing academic acceleration for advanced learners published by the Belin-Blank Center at the University of Iowa. This report supplies the evidence that no other educational intervention works as well as acceleration for gifted students. It provides parents, educators, administrators, and policymakers with the research on acceleration and the tools to advocate for their brightest students.

== Contents ==
This report includes two volumes. Volume I presents the research in layman's terms, and includes profiles of students and families who have benefited from academic acceleration. Volume II contains the research itself, with chapters by many top gifted education scholars.

Topics covered in the report include:

- Forms of acceleration
- Academic and social/emotional effects of acceleration
- Talent Search
- STEM acceleration
- Acceleration with twice-exceptional students
- International perspectives
