= Miraca Gross =

Australian writer

Miraca Una Murdoch Gross AM (1944-2022) was an Australian author and scholar recognised as an authority on the academic, social and emotional needs of gifted children.

== Life ==
Born and trained in Scotland but spending a large part of her life in Australia, Gross was Professor of Gifted Education at the University of New South Wales School of Education and the director of Gifted Education, Research, Resource and Information Centre. She was a frequent speaker at international conferences and a columnist for the quarterly journal, Understanding Our Gifted.

Gross graduated from Purdue University with her PhD thesis being titled "Children of exceptional intellectual potential: Their origin and development".

Her 1993 book Exceptionally Gifted Children presents fifteen subjects selected from a longitudinal study of 40 Australian children with IQs in excess of 160, including Fields Medal recipient Terence Tao among others. The second edition was published in 2003. There were 60 highly gifted children in her ongoing study. Gross advocated radical acceleration for exceptionally and profoundly gifted children.

Gross won five international research awards and held the position of President of the Gifted and Talented Children's Association of South Australia for six years. From 1995 to 1999 she served on the seven-person Executive of the World Council for Gifted and Talented Children.

Gross was inducted as a Member of the Order of Australia in 2008.

== Selected books ==
- 1993 Exceptionally Gifted Children ISBN 0-415-06417-1
- 2003 Exceptionally Gifted Children 2nd Edition ISBN 0-415-31490-9
- 2010 Miraca Gross, In Her Own Write: A Lifetime in Gifted Education ISBN 9780733429132

== Selected articles ==
- Factors in the social adjustment and social acceptability of extremely gifted children
- Exceptionally and Profoundly Gifted Students: An Underserved Population
- From “the saddest sound” to the D Major chord: The gift of accelerated progression
- Radical Acceleration in Australia: Terence Tao
- Small Poppies: highly gifted children in the early years

== Awards ==
- 1987 Intertel Foundation: Hollingworth Award for Excellence in Research in the Education and Psychology of the Gifted
- 1988 and 1990 Mensa International Education and Research Foundation Award for Excellence
- 1995 American National Association for Gifted Children (NAGC): Early Scholar Award
- 1995 UNSW: Vice-Chancellor's Award for Excellence in Teaching
- 1997 Australian Government: Australian Award for University Teaching in Education
- 2003 Australian College of Educators: Sir Harold Wyndham Medal for outstanding services to Australian education
- 2005 American National Association for Gifted Children: Distinguished Scholar Award
