= Joseph Renzulli =

American educational psychologist

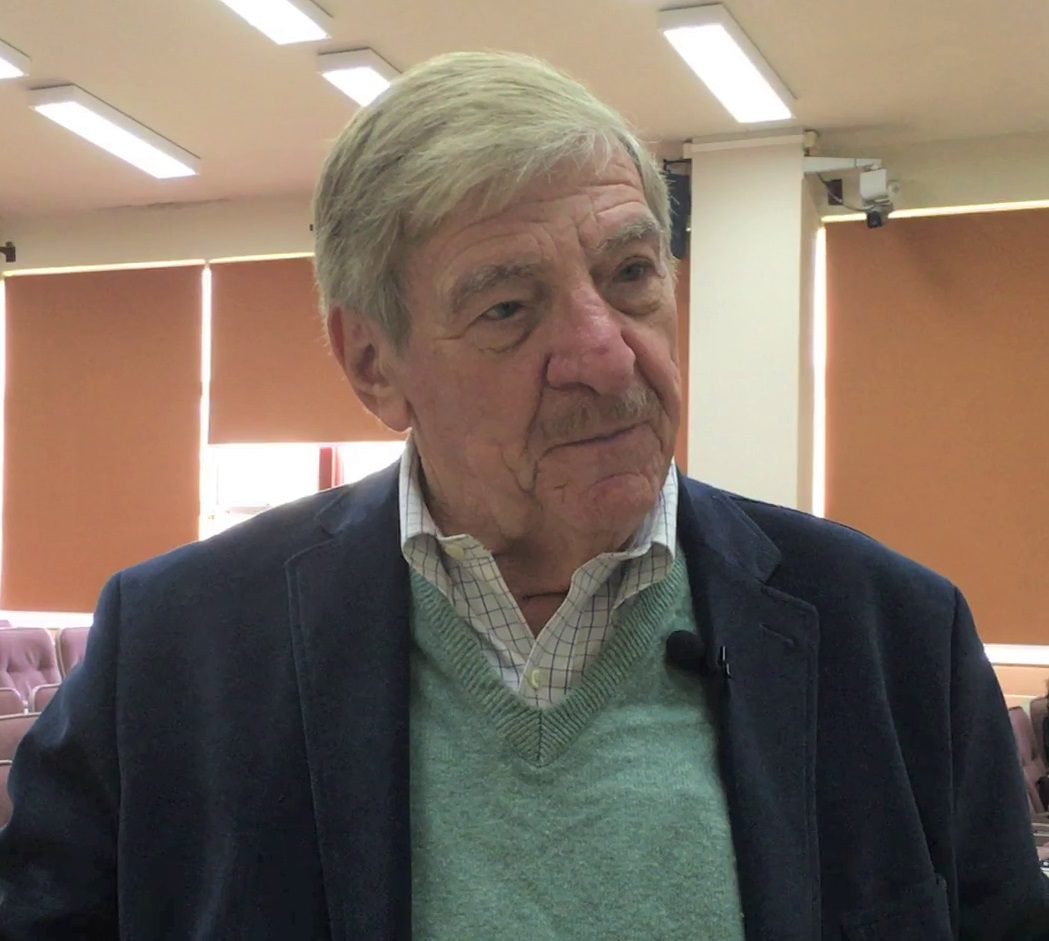
- Born: July 7, 1936 (age 89)
- Occupations: Scientist; Author

Joseph Renzulli (born July 7, 1936) is an American educational psychologist. He is the Board of Trustees Distinguished Professor at the University of Connecticut's Neag School of Education.

== Early life ==
Renzulli graduated with a bachelor's degree from Rowan University. He earned a master in education degree from Rutgers University, and a doctorate from the University of Virginia.

== Career ==
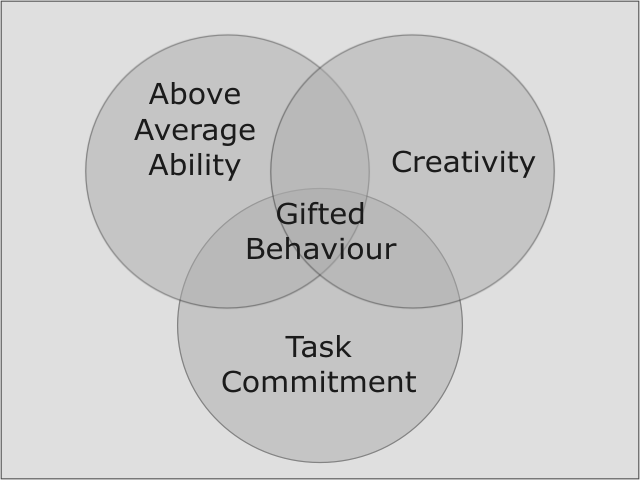

Renzulli is the Board of Trustees Distinguished Professor at the University of Connecticut's Neag School of Education, where he also serves as director of the National Research Center on the Gifted and Talented. His research has focused on the identification and development of creativity and giftedness in young people and on organizational models and curricular strategies for total school improvement. A focus of his work has been on applying the strategies of gifted education to the improvement of learning for all students.

Renzulli developed the three-ring model of giftedness, which promoted a broadened conception of giftedness. He also developed the "Schoolwide Enrichment Model" for developing children's talents in schools. Renzulli is known for his contributions to understanding giftedness. He argues that high potential individuals may only turn their asset into talent if their environment encourages it.

Renzulli is a Fellow in the American Psychological Association and was a consultant to the White House Task Force on Education of the Gifted and Talented. He established the UConn Mentor Connection program for gifted young students and the summer Confratute program at UConn in 1978, which has served thousands of teachers and administrators from around the world.

== Selected publications ==
- Renzulli, J.S. (1978). What Makes Giftedness? Reexamining a Definition. Phi Delta Kappan, 60(3), 180-184, 261.
- Renzulli, J.S. (1994). Schools for talent development: A practical plan for total school improvement. Mansfield Center, CT: Creative Learning Press.
- Renzulli, J.S., & Reis, S.M. (1985). The schoolwide enrichment model: A comprehensive plan for educational excellence. Mansfield Center, CT: Creative Learning Press.
