= Selma Wassermann =

Canadian-American educator and author

- Education: CCNY (BS, MS), New York University (EdD)
- Spouse: Jack Wassermann
- Awards: Teaching Excellence Award, Simon Fraser University, 1989; National Humanities Faculty, United States, 1988

Selma Wassermann (born 1929) is a Canadian-American author, educator, and researcher. She is a Professor Emerita at Simon Fraser University, where she led the creation of the teacher education program.

== Education and career ==
Wassermann was born in 1929 in New York City and grew up in public schools in Brooklyn, New York. She attended City College of New York, where she received a Bachelor of Science in 1950, and a Master of Science in 1956. She earned a Doctorate of Education in 1962 from New York University.

Wassermann's first year of teaching was in San Francisco, and then she returned to New York where she taught until 1966 at which point she moved to Vancouver, British Columbia, Canada to begin the teacher education program at Simon Fraser University. Wassermann retired from teaching in 2000.

== Work ==
Wassermann is known for her work on child-centered education and children's books. In education, she has written on play in the classroom, case method teaching, and how to work within a K-8 classroom. Wasserman has also published children's books, including books about a chimpanzee named Moonbeam and a submariner named Sailor Jack, and an app to help children learn to read. Her book on maintaining relationships with grandchildren from afar, The Long Distance Grandmother, had its fourth edition released in 2001.

== Selected publications ==
- Wassermann, Selma (1992-03-01). "Serious Play in the Classroom: How Messing around Can Win You the Nobel Prize". Childhood Education. 68 (3): 133–139. doi:10.1080/00094056.1992.10522562. ISSN 0009-4056.
- Wassermann, Selma (1993). Getting down to cases : learning to teach with case studies. New York: Teachers College Press. ISBN 0-8077-3291-5. OCLC 28184017.
- Wassermann, Selma (1994). Introduction to case method teaching : a guide to the galaxy. New York, NY: Teachers College Press, Teachers College, Columbia University. ISBN 0-8077-3368-7. OCLC 30475085.
- Wassermann, Selma (2001). The long distance grandmother : how to stay close to distant grandchildren (4th ed.). Point Roberts, WA: Hartley & Marks Publishers. ISBN 0-88179-188-1. OCLC 45320386.
- Wassermann, Selma (2009). Teaching for thinking today : theory, strategies, and activities for the K-8 classroom. Teachers College Press. ISBN 978-0-8077-7142-6. OCLC 918930437.

== Awards and honors ==
In 1988 Wasserman was elected to the National Humanities Faculty in the United States. In 1989 she received the award for teaching excellence from Simon Fraser University.
