= Jonathan Plucker =

Jonathan Plucker is the Julian C. Stanley Professor of Talent Development at Johns Hopkins University, where he works in the School of Education and the Center for Talented Youth. He previously served as Raymond Neag Endowed Professor of Education at the University of Connecticut and as a professor of educational psychology and cognitive science at Indiana University. A scholar of creativity, intelligence, and education policy, he is the author of over 200 papers and author or editor of four books: Critical Issues and Practices in Gifted Education with Carolyn Callahan (1st and 2nd editions), Essentials of Creativity Assessment with James Kaufman and John Baer, and Intelligence 101 with Amber Esping. Plucker has also led the development of a popular web site on human intelligence. He was the 2007-2008 president of the American Psychological Association's Society for the Psychology of Aesthetics, Creativity, and the Arts (Division 10).

Plucker received his bachelor's degree in chemistry education from The University of Connecticut in 1991, where he also received a master's degree in educational psychology in 1992. After briefly serving as an elementary school teacher, he attended the University of Virginia, where he received his doctorate in educational psychology in 1995. After briefly teaching for two years at the University of Maine, he arrived at Indiana University in 1997 as a visiting assistant professor. He became a tenure-track assistant professor in 1998, with promotion to associate professor in 2001 and full professor in 2006.

When at Indiana University, he was the founding director of the Center for Evaluation and Education Policy, and he also directed the Consortium for Education and Social Science Research from 2009 to 2012.

Plucker has received a number of honors for his work. For his creativity work, he has received the Daniel E. Berlyne Award for outstanding research by a junior scholar (2001) and the Rudolf Arnheim Award for outstanding research by a senior scholar (2012) from Division 10 of the American Psychological Association, and the 2007 E. Paul Torrance Award for creativity research from the National Association of Gifted Children. For his gifted education research, he has received the NAGC Early Scholar Award (1998), NAGC Distinguished Scholar Award (2013), and two awards from the Mensa Education & Research Foundation Award for Excellence in Research (1997 & 2000). For his education policy work, he has been ranked several times as one of the Top 100 most influential academics working in education policy.

Plucker is a fellow of the American Psychological Association (2009) and was named a Fellow of the American Associate for the Advancement of Science in 2011 "for distinguished contributions to the science of creativity and the creation of research-supported education policy."
