= Intellectual giftedness =

Intellectual ability significantly higher than average

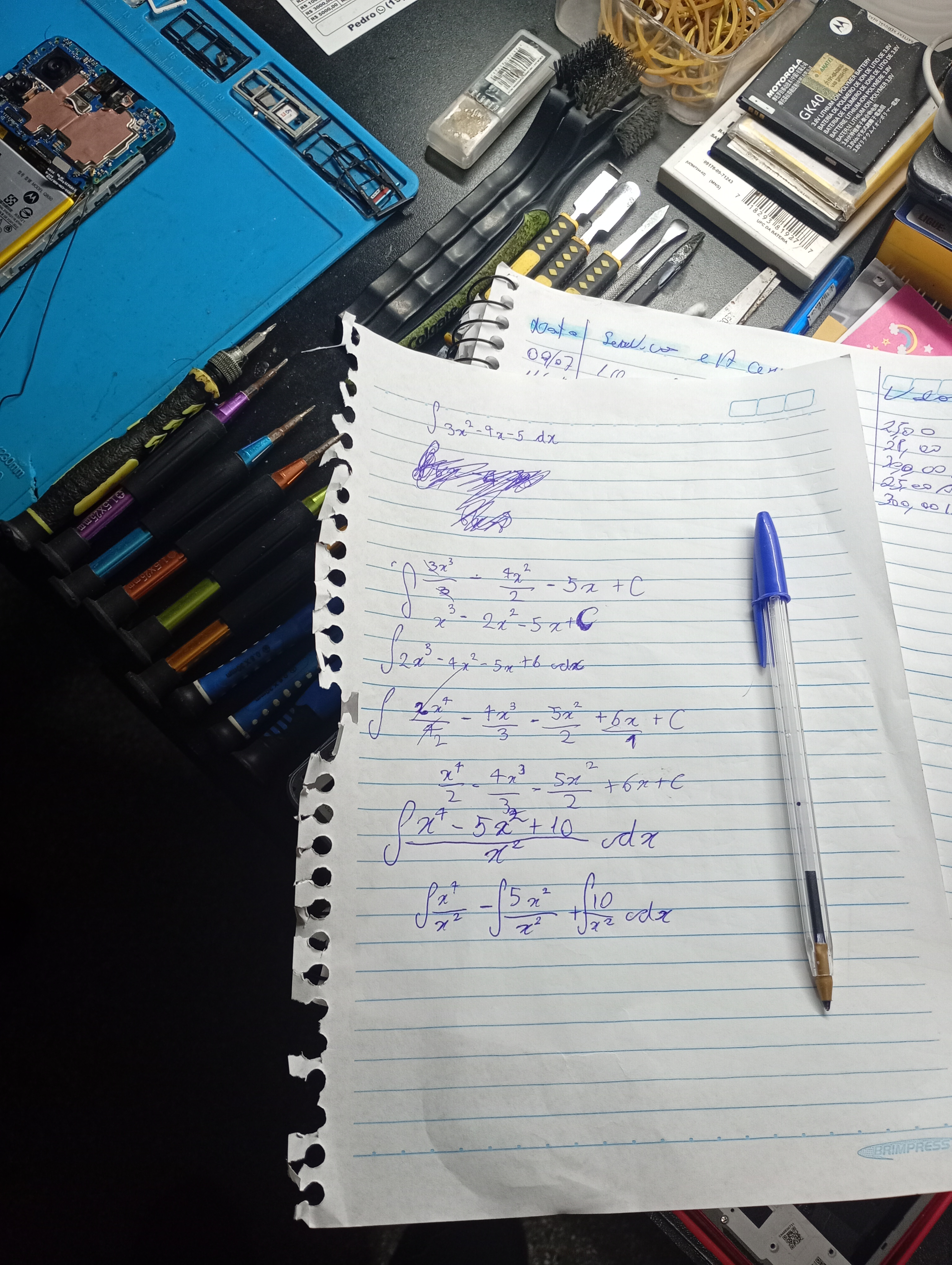
Example of giftedness in routine tasks: the individual frequently opts for complex and alternative challenges

Intellectual giftedness is an intellectual ability significantly higher than average and can also be called as high intellectual potential. It is a characteristic of children, variously defined, that motivates differences in school programming. It is thought to persist as a trait into adult life, with various consequences studied in longitudinal studies of giftedness over the last century. These consequences sometimes include stigmatizing and social exclusion. There is no generally agreed definition of giftedness for either children or adults, but most school placement decisions and most longitudinal studies over the course of individual lives have followed people with IQs in the top 2.5 percent of the population—that is, IQs above or around the 130 mark. Definitions of giftedness also vary across cultures.

The various definitions of intellectual giftedness include either general high ability or specific abilities. For example, by some definitions, an intellectually gifted person may have a striking talent for mathematics without equally strong language skills. In particular, the relationship between artistic ability or musical ability and the high academic ability usually associated with high IQ scores is still being explored, with some authors referring to all of those forms of high ability as "giftedness", while other authors distinguish "giftedness" from "talent". There is still much controversy and much research on the topic of how adult performance unfolds from trait differences in childhood, and what educational and other supports best help the development of adult giftedness.

== Identification ==
=== Overview ===
The identification of giftedness first emerged after the development of IQ tests for school placement. It has since become an important issue for schools, as the instruction of gifted students often presents special challenges. During the twentieth century, gifted children were often classified via IQ tests; other identification procedures have been proposed but are only used in a minority of cases in most public schools in the English-speaking world. Developing useful identification procedures for students who could benefit from a more challenging school curriculum is an ongoing problem in school administration.

Because of the key role that gifted education programs in schools play in the identification of gifted individuals, both children and adults, it is worthwhile to examine how schools define the term "gifted".

=== Definitions ===
Since Lewis Terman in 1916, psychometricians and psychologists have sometimes equated giftedness with high IQ. Later researchers (e.g., Raymond Cattell, J. P. Guilford, and Louis Leon Thurstone) have argued that intellect cannot be expressed in such a unitary manner, and have suggested more multifaceted approaches to intelligence.

Research conducted in the 1980s and 1990s has provided data that supports notions of multiple components to intelligence. This is particularly evident in the reexamination of "giftedness" by Sternberg and Davidson in their collection of articles Conceptions of Giftedness (1986; second edition 2005). The many different conceptions of giftedness presented, although distinct, are interrelated in several ways. Most of the investigators define giftedness in terms of multiple qualities, not all of which are intellectual. IQ scores are often viewed as inadequate measures of giftedness. Motivation, high self-concept, and creativity are key qualities in many of these broadened conceptions of giftedness.

Joseph Renzulli's (1978) "three ring" definition of giftedness is one frequently mentioned conceptualization of giftedness. Renzulli's definition, which defines gifted behaviors rather than gifted individuals, is composed of three components as follows: Gifted behavior consists of behaviors that reflect an interaction among three basic clusters of human traits—above average ability, high levels of task commitment, and high levels of creativity. Individuals capable of developing gifted behavior are those possessing or capable of developing this composite set of traits and applying them to any potentially valuable area of human performance. Persons who manifest or are capable of developing an interaction among the three clusters require a wide variety of educational opportunities and services that are not ordinarily provided through regular instructional programs.

In Identifying Gifted Children: A Practical Guide, Susan K. Johnsen explains that gifted children all exhibit the potential for high performance in the areas included in the United States' federal definition of gifted and talented students:

There is a federal government statutory definition of gifted and talented students in the United States.

The term "gifted and talented" when used in respect to students, children, or youth means students, children, or youth who give evidence of high-performance capability in areas such as intellectual, creative, artistic, or leadership capacity, or in specific academic fields, and who require services or activities not ordinarily provided by the school in order to fully develop such capabilities." (The Improving America's Schools Act of 1994, P.L. 103–382, Title XIV, p. 388)

This definition has been adopted partially or completely by the majority of the individual states in the United States (which have the main responsibility for education policy as compared to the federal government). Most states have a definition similar to that used in the State of Texas:

"gifted and talented student" means a child or youth who performs at or shows the potential for performing at a remarkably high level of accomplishment when compared to others of the same age, experience, or environment, and who

- exhibits high-performance capability in an intellectual, creative, or artistic area;
- possesses an unusual capacity for leadership; or
- excels in a specific academic field." (74th legislature of the State of Texas, Chapter 29, Subchapter D, Section 29.121)

The major characteristics of these definitions are (a) the diversity of areas in which performance may be exhibited (e.g., intellectual, creativity, artistic, leadership, academically), (b) the comparison with other groups (e.g., those in general education classrooms or of the same age, experience, or environment), and (c) the use of terms that imply a need for development of the gift (e.g., capability and potential).

Another understanding of giftedness is that of asynchronous development. This asynchrony has also been referred to as "dyssynchrony" (Terrassier 1985). It can be within the person; where the child has distinctly different development levels socially, emotionally, physically, or even between different academic areas. It can also be asynchrony between the child and their social and/or academic environment.

The Columbus Group came together in 1991 to talk about their concerns that the current trends in gifted education focused overwhelmingly on achievement and the future impact these students could have on the world, and were missing focusing on and valuing who those children are in the moment, and what their lived experiences were like. They created a definition of giftedness that centers around asynchrony and intensity, which first appeared in print in an article titled "Giftedness: The View from Within" (Morelock, 1992). It states that:

"Giftedness is asynchronous development in which advanced cognitive abilities and heightened intensity combine to create inner experiences and awareness that are qualitatively different from the norm. This asynchrony increases with higher intellectual capacity. The uniqueness of the gifted renders them particularly vulnerable and requires modifications in parenting, teaching and counseling in order for them to develop optimally."

This definition shares many commonalities with the definitions above, but also emphasizes the parenting and counseling differences gifted students may need to be fully supported.

=== Neuroscience of giftedness ===
Since the late 90s, the development of the brain of people with high IQ scores has been shown to be different to that of people with average IQ scores. A longitudinal study over 6 years has shown that high-IQ children have a thinner cerebral cortex when young, which then grows quickly and becomes significantly thicker than the other children's by the time they become teenagers.

=== Identification methods ===
IQ scores can vary for the same person, so a person does not always belong to the same IQ score range each time the person is tested. (IQ score table data and pupil pseudonyms adapted from description of KABC-II norming study cited in Kaufman 2009.)
Pupil	KABC-II	WISC-III	WJ-III
Asher	90	95	111
Brianna	125	110	105
Colin	100	93	101
Danica	116	127	118
Elpha	93	105	93
Fritz	106	105	105
Georgi	95	100	90
Hector	112	113	103
Imelda	104	96	97
Jose	101	99	86
Jorawar	81	78	75
Leo	116	124	102

In psychology, identification of giftedness is usually based on IQ scores. The threshold of IQ = 130 is defined by statistical rarity. By convention, the 5% of scores who fall more than two standard deviations from the mean (or more accurately 1.96) are considered atypical. In the case of intelligence, these 5% are partitioned to both sides of the range of scores, and include the 2.5% who score more than two standard deviations below the mean and the 2.5% who score more than two standard deviations above the mean. Because the average of IQ is 100 and its standard deviation is 15, this rule places the threshold for intellectual disability at IQ = 70, and the symmetrical threshold for giftedness at IQ = 130 (rounded). This arbitrary threshold is used by most psychologists in most countries.

While IQ testing has the advantage of providing a standardised basis for the diagnosis of giftedness, psychologists are expected to interpret IQ scores in the context of all available information: standardized intelligence tests ignore actual achievement and can fail to detect giftedness. For example, a specific learning disorder such as dyslexia or dyspraxia can easily decrease scores on intelligence tests and hide true intellectual ability.

In educational settings, many schools in the US use a variety of assessments of students' capability and potential when identifying gifted children. These may include portfolios of student work, classroom observations, achievement tests, and IQ test scores. Most educational professionals accept that no single criterion can be used in isolation to accurately identify a gifted child.

One of the criteria used in identification may be an IQ test score. Until the late 1960s, when "giftedness" was defined solely based on an IQ score, a school district simply set an arbitrary score (usually in the 130 range) and a student either did or did not "make the cut". This method is still used by many school districts because it is simple and objective. Although a high IQ score is not the sole indicator of giftedness, usually if a student has a very high IQ, that is a significant indicator of high academic potential. Because of this consideration, if a student scores highly on an IQ test, but performs at an average or below-average level academically, school officials may think that this issue warrants further investigation as an example of underachievement. However, scholars of educational testing point out that a test-taker's scores on any two tests may vary, so a lower score on an achievement test than on an IQ test neither necessarily indicates that the test-taker is underachieving nor necessarily that the school curriculum is under-challenging.

IQ classification varies from one publisher to another. IQ tests have poor reliability for determining test-takers' rank order at higher IQ levels, and are perhaps only effective at determining whether a student is gifted rather than distinguishing among levels of giftedness. The Wechsler test manuals have standard score ceilings of 160. However, higher ceilings, including scores into the exceptionally and profoundly gifted range, exist for the WISC-IV and WISC-V, which were specifically normed on large samples of gifted children. Today, the Wechsler child and adult IQ tests are by far the most commonly used IQ tests in hospitals, schools, and private psychological practice. Older versions of the Stanford-Binet test, now obsolete, and the Cattell IQ test purport to yield IQ scores of 180 or higher, but those scores are not comparable to scores on currently normed tests. The Stanford-Binet Third Revision (Form L-M) yields consistently higher numerical scores for the same test-taker than scores obtained on current tests. This has prompted some authors on identification of gifted children to promote the Stanford-Binet form L-M, which has long been obsolete, as the only test with a sufficient ceiling to identify the exceptionally and profoundly gifted, despite the Stanford-Binet L-M never having been normed on a representative national sample. Because the instrument is outdated, current results derived from the Stanford-Binet L-M generate inflated and inaccurate scores. The IQ assessment of younger children remains debated.

While many people believe giftedness is a strictly quantitative difference, measurable by IQ tests, some authors on the "experience of being" have described giftedness as a fundamentally different way of perceiving the world, which in turn affects every experience had by the gifted individual. This view is doubted by some scholars who have closely studied gifted children longitudinally.

=== Across cultures ===
Characteristics and attributes associated with giftedness varies across cultures. While intelligence is extremely important in Western and some other cultures, such an emphasis is not consistent throughout the world. For example, in Japan, there is more of a value placed on an individual's motivation and diligence. When Japanese students are given a task, they attribute success to factors like effort, whereas American students tend to attribute success to ability. Similarly, when Japanese students fail, they refer the failure to lack of effort. On the other hand, American students believe failure is due to a lack of ability. There are conceptions in rural Kenya that identify four types of intelligence: initiative (paro), knowledge and skills (rieko), respect (luoro), and comprehension of how to handle real-life problems (winjo). Chan cites the Chinese belief that aspects of giftedness are innate, but that people can become gifted through industriousness, perseverance, and learning. Not all who are intellectually gifted display every noticeable characteristic.

There are many reasons gifted students who have various backgrounds are not as successful at Western intelligence/achievement tests:

- Not used to answering questions just for the purpose of showing knowledge – they are used to using their knowledge to respond to authentic problems.
- May perform poorly on paper-and-pencil tasks in an artificial lab setting.
- May perform poorly on a culturally biased test, especially if not their own.
- Have test anxiety or suffer from stereotype threat.

Many traits that demonstrate intellectual giftedness are identified across a multitude of cultures, such as:

- Displaying advanced reasoning and creative thinking, generating ideas beyond the norm
- Resourceful and adaptable
- Strongly motivated to understand the world
- Well developed vocabulary in native language
- Learns concepts quickly, and builds/develops these concepts
- Strong sense of justice and morality
- Displays leadership skills in various ways, such as persuasion, taking initiative, and leading by example
- Comprehending and using humor beyond their age

== Developmental theory ==
Gifted children may develop asynchronously: their minds are often ahead of their physical growth, and specific cognitive and emotional functions are often developed differently (or to differing extents) at different stages of development. One frequently cited example of asynchronicity in early cognitive development is Albert Einstein, who was delayed in speech, but whose later fluency and accomplishments belied this initial delay. Psychologist and cognitive scientist Steven Pinker theorized that, rather than viewing Einstein's (and other famously gifted late-talking individuals) adult accomplishments as existing distinct from, or in spite of, his early language deficits, and rather than viewing Einstein's lingual delay itself as a "disorder", it may be that Einstein's genius and his delay in speaking were developmentally intrinsic to one another.

It has been said that gifted children may advance more quickly through stages established by post-Freudian developmentalists such as Jean Piaget. Gifted individuals also experience the world differently, resulting in certain social and emotional issues.

Francoy Gagne's (2000) Differentiated Model of Giftedness and Talent (DMGT) is a developmental theory that distinguishes giftedness from talent, offering explanation on how outstanding natural abilities (gifts) develop into specific expert skills (talents). According to DMGT theory, "one cannot become talented without first being gifted, or almost so". There are six components that can interact in countless and unique ways that foster the process of moving from having natural abilities (giftedness) to systematically developed skills.

These components consist of the gift (G) itself, chance (C), environmental catalyst (EC), intrapersonal catalyst (IC), learning/practice (LP) and the outcome of talent (T). It is important to know that (C), (IC), and (EC) can facilitate but can also hinder the learning and training of becoming talented. The learning/practice is the moderator. It is through the interactions, both environmental and intrapersonal that influence the process of learning and practice along with/without chance that natural abilities are transformed into talents.

== Multiple intelligences theory ==
Multiple intelligences has been associated with giftedness or overachievement of some developmental areas (Colangelo, 2003). Multiple intelligences has been described as an attitude towards learning, instead of techniques or strategies (Cason, 2001).

Howard Gardner proposed in Frames of Mind (Gardner 1983/1994) that intellectual giftedness may be present in areas other than the typical intellectual realm. The concept of Multiple Intelligences (MI) makes the field aware of additional potential strengths and proposes a variety of curricular methods. Gardner argued that there are eight intelligences, or different areas in which people assimilate or learn about the world around them: interpersonal, intrapersonal, bodily-kinesthetic, linguistic, logical-mathematical, musical, naturalistic, and spatial-visual.

The most common criticism of Gardner's MI theory is "the belief by scholars that each of the seven multiple intelligences is a cognitive style rather than a stand-alone construct". Others consider the theory not to be sufficiently empirical. This perspective has also been criticized on the grounds that it is ad hoc: that Gardner is not expanding the definition of the word "intelligence", but rather denies the existence of intelligence as traditionally understood, and instead uses the word "intelligence" where other people have traditionally used words like "ability" and "aptitude".

Identification of gifted students with MI is a challenge since there is no simple test to determine the giftedness of MI. Assessing by observation is potentially most accurate, but potentially highly subjective. MI theory can be applied to not only gifted students, but it can be a lens through which all students can be assessed. This more global perspective may lead to more child-centered instruction and meet the needs of a greater number of children (Colangelo, 2003).

== Characteristics ==
Generally, gifted or advanced students learn more quickly, deeply, and broadly than their peers. They may talk early, learn to read early, and progress at the same level as normal children who are significantly older. Gifted students also tend to demonstrate high reasoning ability, creativity, curiosity, a large vocabulary, and an excellent memory. They can often master concepts with few repetitions. They may also be perfectionistic, and frequently question authority. Some have trouble relating to or communicating with their peers because of disparities in vocabulary size (especially in the early years), personality, interests, and motivation. As children, they may prefer the company of older children or adults. Teachers may notice that gifted students tend to hover around them more than the other students. This is because gifted students sometimes think that they cannot relate to the students their own age, so they try to communicate with the teacher.

It is possible that there are different types of giftedness with their own unique features, just as there are different types of developmental delay.

Giftedness may become noticeable in individuals at different points of development. While early development (i.e. speaking or reading at a very young age) usually comes with giftedness, it is not a determinant factor of giftedness.

Giftedness is frequently not evenly distributed throughout all intellectual spheres. One gifted student may excel in solving logic problems yet be a poor speller. Another may be able to read and write at a far above-average level yet have trouble with mathematics.

Some children identified as academically gifted may in fact struggle when presented with open-ended tasks that call for creative thinking, particularly with questions that do not have a single, correct answer. In 1981, educator Selma Wassermann interviewed a group of gifted children aged ten to twelve to see them demonstrate higher-order cognitive skills; she posed to them various open-ended questions that demanded creative thinking to solve, such as how they supposed birds learn to fly. The children, not knowing the "correct" answer, did not answer any of her questions. Wassermann wrote of her experience:

Again and again I encounter responses in which the pupils try to manipulate me into helping them "get the right answer." The more I avoid doing this, the more tense they seem. Their dependency, their rigidity, their intolerance for ambiguity, their inability to take cognitive risks and their anxiety are astonishing.

In contrast, when she asked a group of "low achievers" how one would weigh a giraffe, they rose up to the challenge and suggested answers. Wasserman found out that the difference in the responses of the two groups was caused by the gifted students' anxiety and fear of making mistakes brought on by high expectations and pressures coming from parents and teachers. Though the students were highly gifted lesson-learners, the lower-level cognitive task of learning does not automatically carry over into the higher-level tasks of problem-solving or imagination and creativity, and were thus inexperienced in dealing with problems that demand higher-level cognition. The "low achiever" group on the other hand routinely confronted on the street situations that required problem-solving skills, thus enabling them to become "street-wise".

== Savantism ==
Savants are individuals who perform exceptionally in a single field of learning. More often, the terms savant and savantism describe people with a competence level in a single field of learning well beyond what is considered normal, even among the gifted community. Such individuals are alternatively termed idiot savants ─ a term that has been mentioned as early as the eighteenth century. Autistic savantism refers to the exceptional abilities occasionally exhibited by people with autism or other pervasive developmental disorders. These abilities often come with below-age-level functioning in most, if not all areas of skilled performance. The term was introduced in a 1978 article in Psychology Today describing this condition. It is also proposed that there are savants with normal or superior IQ such as those with Autism Spectrum Disorder, who demonstrate special abilities involving numbers, mathematics, mechanical, and spatial skills.

== Gifted minority students in the United States ==
The majority of students enrolled in gifted programs are White; Black and Hispanic students constitute a smaller proportion than their enrollment in school. For example, statistics from 1993 indicate that in the U.S., Black students represented 16.2% of public school students, but only constituted 8.4% of students enrolled in gifted education programs. Similarly, while Hispanic students represented 9% of public school students, these students only represented 4.7% of those identified as gifted. However, Asian students make up only 3.6% of the student body, yet constitute 14% in the gifted programs. Poor students are also underrepresented in gifted programs, even more than Black and Hispanic students are.

Lack of equity and access in programs for the gifted has been acknowledged since the early twentieth century. In the 1920s, research by Lillian Steele Proctor pointed to systemic racism as a contributor to the relative invisibility of gifted African American youth. In their 2004 study, "Addressing the Achievement Gap Between Minority and Nonminority Children by Increasing Access to Gifted Programs" Olszewski-Kubilius et al. write that minority students are "less likely to be nominated by teachers as potential candidates for gifted programs and, if nominated, are less likely to be selected for the program, particularly when such traditional measures as I.Q. and achievement tests are used for identification."

This underrepresentation of such students in gifted programs is attributed to a multiplicity of factors including cultural bias of testing procedures, selective referrals and educator bias, and reliance on deficit-based paradigms. To address the inequities in assessment procedures, researchers suggest the use of multiple tests and alternative methods of testing, such as performance-based assessment measures, oral-expressiveness measures as well as non-verbal ability assessments (such as Naglieri Nonverbal Abilities Tests (NNAT) or Raven's Matrix Analogies Tests).

According to 2013-2014 data collected by the Office of Civil Rights of the Department of Education, White students have more opportunities and exposure to attending schools that offer gifted and talented education programs (GATE) than racial and ethnic minority students, specifically Black and Latino students. Data collected by the Office of Civil Rights department of the Department of Education also reveal that racial/ethnic minority students are underrepresented in gifted and talented education programs. Forty-nine percent of all students enrolled in schools that offer GATE programs are White, whereas 42% of all students enrolled in schools that offer GATE programs are Latino and Black, thus revealing that white people have more opportunities to be a part of a school that offers GATE programs. Within GATE programs, 29% of the students are Latino and Black, and 57% are White (U.S. Department of Education, 2016).

Weinstein (2002) suggests that some teachers recommend racial minority students— with the exception of Asian students— to special education and remedial classes more often than gifted and talented classes due to teacher expectancy biases placed on racial minority students. Teachers' expectations of their students' academic performance influence how students perceive themselves. If a teacher expects more success academically from specific students, those students are prone to displaying behavior and work ethic that will set them apart from others in a positive light, whereas if a teacher only expects the bare minimum from his or her students, those students will merely do what is expected of them (Weinstein, 2002).

Racial minority students who are perceived as being disadvantaged from their peers in regards to socioeconomic status tend to have less supportive relations with their teachers (Fitzpatrick, 2015). Due to this lack of support, teachers do not expect these disadvantaged students to go above and beyond, therefore they are often overlooked when it is time for gifted and talented education program nominations. Research suggests that teacher expectancy bias can also be diminished by matching the racial demographics of students to that of teachers. Gershenson and colleagues (2016) found that non-Black teachers held low expectations of their black students, specifically in relation to black male students and math, whereas Black teachers held high expectations of black male students in regards to math. This finding suggests that racial diversity among educators is a positive step toward diminishing teacher expectancy bias.

Weinstein and colleagues (1991) aimed to change the low expectations attached to racial minority students of an urban high school that placed many Black and Latino students in remedial programs rather than college preparatory or honor classes. The study aimed to prepare these racial minority students for college-level academic work while attending high school. With positive teacher attitudes toward students and greater teacher self-efficacy, the students who were once on track to being recommended for remedial classes were performing at advanced academic levels after 2 years of intervention. They were also more heavily involved in leadership roles at their high school. This study supports the claim that teacher expectancy contributes to how a student sees him or herself in regards to achievements (Weinstein et al., 1991).

Gifted students of color experience success when multicultural content is incorporated in the curriculum and furthermore when the curriculum itself is designed to be culturally and linguistically compatible. A culturally diverse curriculum and instruction encourages gifted minority students to experience a sense of belonging and validation as scholars. Furthermore, the educator's role in this process is significant as Lee et al. argue that "[t]eacher awareness and understanding of students' racial and cultural differences and their ability to incorporate multicultural perspectives into curricular content and instructional techniques may counter gifted minority students' discomfort in being one of the few minority students in gifted programs."

== Twice-exceptional ==
The term twice-exceptional was coined by James J. Gallagher to denote students who are both gifted and have disabilities. In other words, twice-exceptional students are those who have two special needs. For instance, they might have gifted learning needs and a learning disability. Or, they may be a gifted learner and have a developmental disability, such as autism spectrum disorder.

People have known about twice-exceptional students for decades; however, identification and program strategies remain ambiguous. These students represent a unique challenge for the educational system. Teachers and educators will need to make special accommodations for their learning deficits (such as remediation), yet adapt the curriculum to meet their advanced learning needs (for instance, through acceleration or enrichment). Twice-exceptional students are considered to be at risk because they are hidden within the general population of their educational environment, and often viewed as either underachievers or average learners.

Early identification and intervention is critical; however, giftedness in the twice-exceptional population is often identified later than in the average population as it is masked by the disability. The disabilities may include auditory processing weaknesses, sensory-motor integration issues, visual perceptual difficulties, spatial disorientation, dyslexia, and attention deficits. Recognition of learning difficulties among the gifted is made extremely difficult by virtue of their ability to compensate. Among the signs that the student may be twice-exceptional are apparent inconsistencies between abilities and results, deficits in short-term memory and attention, and negative behaviors such as being sarcastic, negative, or aggressive.

A child prodigy who demonstrates qualities to be twice-exceptional may encounter additional difficulties. With insight at a young age, it is possible for them to be constantly aware of the risk of failure. This can be detrimental to their emotional state and academic achievement. If a child comprehends a subject well, but due to a developmental disorder receives poor grades in a subject, the child may have difficulty understanding why there is little success in that subject.

== Social and emotional development ==
Research over the years has shown mixed results when looking at the psychological well-being of gifted children, according to a 1999 review of research by Neihart. The timeline of research into the impact of giftedness on mental health shows swings from the view point that it increases risk in the late 19th century to Terman's research that the gifted experienced fewer adjustment issues than others. In 1981, a gifted high school student died of suicide and "the phrase, 'social and emotional needs of the gifted' was coined." (Neihart, 1999, p. 10). This event also sparked the birth of the organization SENG, founded by Dr. James T. Webb, as a way to support and educate the gifted community about these needs.

A 2016 review of research facilitated by the National Association for Gifted Children (NAGC) in the United States continues to show that, as a whole, gifted children and young adults are not more susceptible to social and emotional challenges than their typically developing peers. That does not mean, however, that there is nothing special to consider when we are looking to support gifted individuals on their developmental journey.

Asynchrony, as is included in the Columbus Group definition of giftedness above (Morelock, 1992), can manifest as differences in the social and emotional development of gifted students as compared to typically developing peers, and cause them to be "out of step" with others even in a gifted setting. This can lead to challenges for the child that need to be addressed for them to fully develop socially and emotionally.

=== Isolation ===
Social isolation is a common trait in gifted individuals, especially those with no social network of gifted peers. In order to gain popularity, gifted children will often try to hide their abilities to win social approval. Strategies include underachievement (discussed below) and the use of less sophisticated vocabulary when among same-age peers than when among family members or other trusted individuals.

Some believe that the isolation experienced by gifted individuals is not caused by giftedness itself, but by society's response to giftedness and to the rarity of peers. Plucker and Levy have noted that, "in this culture, there appears to be a great pressure for people to be 'normal' with a considerable stigma associated with giftedness or talent." To counteract this problem, gifted education professionals recommend creating a peer group based on common interests and abilities. The earlier this occurs, the more effective it is likely to be in preventing isolation. Since the mid-1940s, several high-IQ societies of varying levels of selectivity have been established to help gifted individuals find intellectual peers, the oldest ones being Mensa and Intertel, established in 1946 and 1966 respectively.

Some research suggests that mathematically gifted adolescents might have deficiencies in social valuation and mentalization, while gifted adolescents in general may struggle with social adaptive learning, but these conclusions are not supported by a large literature.

=== Perfectionism ===
Perfectionism, while considered to have many positive aspects, can be another issue for gifted individuals. It is encouraged by the fact that gifted individuals tend to be easily successful in much of what they do.

Healthy perfectionism refers to having high standards, a desire to achieve, conscientiousness, or high levels of responsibility. It is likely to be a virtue rather than a problem, even if gifted children may have difficulty with healthy perfectionism because they set standards that would be appropriate to their mental age (the level at which they think), but they cannot always meet them because they are bound to a younger body, or the social environment is restrictive. In such cases, outsiders may call some behavior perfectionism, while for the gifted this may simply be their standard. It has been said that perfectionism "becomes desirable when it stimulates the healthy pursuit of excellence."

Some believe that perfectionism can be unhealthy. Unhealthy perfectionism stems from equating one's worth as a human being to one's achievements, and the simultaneous belief that any work less than perfect is unacceptable and will lead to criticism. Because perfection in the majority of human activities is neither desirable, nor possible, this cognitive distortion creates self-doubt, performance anxiety, and ultimately procrastination.

Unhealthy perfectionism can be triggered or further exacerbated by parents, siblings, or classmates. Parents are usually proud and will extensively praise the gifted child. On the other hand, siblings, peers, and school bullies may generally become envious of the intellectual ease of the gifted child and tease them about any minor imperfection in their work, strength, clothes, appearance, or behavior. Either approach—positive reinforcement from parents or negative reactions from siblings and peers for minor flaws—may push gifted children into equating their worth amongst their peers to their own abilities; thus, any imperfection could be viewed as a serious defect in themselves. This unhealthy perfectionism can be further exaggerated when the child counters bullying with the same tactics (i.e., insulting the less exceptional abilities of others), thus creating further disdain in themselves for low or even average performance.

There are many theories that try to explain the correlation between perfectionism and giftedness. Perfectionism can become a problem as it frustrates and inhibits achievements.

D. E. Hamachek identified six specific, overlapping types of behavior associated with perfectionism. They are:

- Depression
- A nagging "I should" feeling
- Shame and guilt feelings
- Face-saving behavior
- Shyness and procrastination
- Self-deprecation

=== Underachievement ===
Underachievement is a significant issue for gifted learners. There is often a stark gap between the abilities of the gifted individual and their actual accomplishments. Many gifted students will perform extremely well on standardized or reasoning tests, only to fail a class exam. It is estimated that half of gifted children do not perform in school at a level that is up to their abilities. Studies of high school dropouts in the United States estimate that between 18% and 25% of gifted students fail to graduate. This disparity can result from various factors, such as loss of interest in classes that are too easy or negative social consequences of being perceived as smart. Underachievement can also result from emotional or psychological factors, including depression, anxiety, perfectionism, low self esteem, or self-sabotage.

An often-overlooked contributor to underachievement is undiagnosed learning disorders. A gifted individual is less likely to be diagnosed with a learning disorder than a non-gifted classmate, as the gifted child can more readily compensate for their paucities. This masking effect is dealt with by understanding that a difference of one standard deviation between scores constitutes a learning disability even if all of the scores are above average. Assessments may also fail to identify some gifted students entirely because their underachieving behaviours keep them from being recognized as exceptional.

Some gifted children may not be aware that they are gifted. One apparently effective way to attempt to reverse underachievement in gifted children includes educating teachers to provide enrichment projects based on students' strengths and interests without attracting negative attention from peers. Other methods include matching the underachiever with an achieving role model, correcting skill deficiencies and ensuring that proper assessments are in place to identify all learning issues with underachieving students.

=== Depression ===
It has been thought in the past that there is a correlation between giftedness and depression. This is not an established research finding. As Reis and Renzulli mention,

With the exception of creatively gifted adolescents who are talented in writing or the visual arts, studies do not confirm that gifted individuals manifest significantly higher or lower rates or severity of depression than those for the general population. Gifted children's advanced cognitive abilities, social isolation, sensitivity, and uneven development may cause them to face some challenging social and emotional issues, but their problem-solving abilities, advanced social skills, moral reasoning, out-of-school interests, and satisfaction in achievement may help them to be more resilient.

There is also no research that points to suicide attempt rates being higher in gifted adolescents than other adolescents.

== See also ==
- A Nation Deceived: How Schools Hold Back America's Brightest Students
- Aptitude
- Autism
- Child prodigy
- Davidson Institute for Talent Development
- Genius
- Gifted education
- Greatness
- Heritability of IQ
- High-IQ society
- IQ classification
- Marland report
- Multipotentiality
- Study of Mathematically Precocious Youth
- Talented programs

== Bibliography ==
- Aiken, Lewis (1979). Psychological Testing and Assessment (Third ed.). Boston: Allyn and Bacon. ISBN 978-0-205-06613-1.
- Ambrose, Don; Sternberg, Robert J.; Sriraman, Bharath, eds. (2003). Confronting Dogmatism in Gifted Education. New York: Routledge. ISBN 978-0-415-89446-3.
- Anastasi, Anne; Urbina, Susana (1997). Psychological Testing (Seventh ed.). Upper Saddle River, NJ: Prentice Hall. ISBN 978-0-02-303085-7.
- Benbow, Camilla Persson; Lubinski, David, eds. (1996). Intellectual Talent: Psychometric and Social Issues. Baltimore: Johns Hopkins University Press. ISBN 978-0-8018-5302-9.
- Borland, James H. (1 January 2003). Rethinking Gifted Education. Teachers College Press. ISBN 978-0-8077-4304-1.
- Burks, Barbara S.; Jensen, Dortha W.; Terman, Lewis M. (1930). The Promise of Youth: Follow-up Studies of a Thousand Gifted Children. Genetic Studies of Genius Volume 3. Stanford, CA: Stanford University Press.
- Campbell, Jonathan M. (2006). "Chapter 3: Mental Retardation/Intellectual Disability". In Campbell, Jonathan M.; Kamphaus, Randy W. (eds.). Psychodiagnostic Assessment of Children: Dimensional and Categorical Approaches. Hoboken, NJ: Wiley. ISBN 978-0-471-21219-5.
- Cianciolo, Anna T.; Sternberg, Robert J. (2004). Intelligence: A Brief History. Blackwell Brief Histories of Psychology. Malden, MA: Blackwell. ISBN 978-1-4051-0824-9.
- Colangelo, Nicholas; Davis, Gary A., eds. (2003). Handbook of Gifted Education. Julian C. Stanley (Guest Foreword). Boston: Allyn & Bacon. ISBN 978-0-205-34063-7.
- Cox, Catherine M. (1926). The Early Mental Traits of 300 Geniuses. Genetic Studies of Genius Volume 2. Stanford, CA: Stanford University Press.
- Crane, Jennifer (2025). 'Gifted Children' in Britain and the World: Elitism and Equality since 1945. Oxford University Press. ISBN 978-0-19-892888-1.
- Dai, David Yun (12 July 2014). The nature and nurture of giftedness: a new framework for understanding gifted education. Teachers College Press. ISBN 978-0-8077-5087-2. OCLC 762963086. Archived from the original on 9 October 2016.
- Davis, Gary A.; Rimm, Sylvia B.; Siegle, Del (April 2010). Education of the Gifted and Talented. Pearson Education, Limited. ISBN 978-0-13-505607-3.
- Dumont, Ron; Willis, John O.; Elliot, Colin D. (2009). Essentials of DAS-II® Assessment. Hoboken, NJ: Wiley. p. 126. ISBN 978-0-470-22520-2.
- Dumont, Ron; Willis, John O. (2013). "Range of DAS Subtest Scaled Scores". Dumont Willis. Archived from the original on 7 April 2014.
- Eysenck, Hans (1995). Genius: The Natural History of Creativity. Problems in the Behavioural Sciences No. 12. Cambridge: Cambridge University Press. ISBN 978-0-521-48508-1.
- Eysenck, Hans (1998). Intelligence: A New Look. New Brunswick, NJ: Transaction Publishers. ISBN 978-0-7658-0707-6.
- Flanagan, Dawn P.; Harrison, Patti L., eds. (2012). Contemporary Intellectual Assessment: Theories, tests, and issues (Third ed.). New York: Guilford Press. ISBN 978-1-60918-995-2.
- Flanagan, Dawn P.; Kaufman, Alan S. (2009). Essentials of WISC-IV Assessment. Essentials of Psychological Assessment (2nd ed.). Hoboken, NJ: Wiley. ISBN 978-0-470-18915-3.
- Flynn, James R. (2012). Are We Getting Smarter? Rising IQ in the Twenty-First Century. Cambridge: Cambridge University Press. ISBN 978-1-107-60917-4.
  - Winerman, Lea (March 2013). "Smarter than ever?". Monitor on Psychology. 44 (3): 30.
- Foote, William E. (2007). "Chapter 17: Evaluations of Individuals for Disability in Insurance and Social Security Contexts". In Jackson, Rebecca (ed.). Learning Forensic Assessment. International Perspectives on Forensic Mental Health. New York: Routledge. pp. 449–480. ISBN 978-0-8058-5923-2.
- Freeman, Joan (2010). Gifted Lives: What Happens when Gifted Children Grow Up. London: Routledge. ISBN 978-0-415-47009-4.
  - Barbieri, Annalisa (8 October 2010). "Young, gifted and likely to suffer for it". The Guardian. Archived from the original on November 11, 2020.
- Freides, David (1972). "Review of Stanford-Binet Intelligence Scale, Third Revision". In Oscar Buros (ed.). Seventh Mental Measurements Yearbook. Highland Park, NJ: Gryphon Press. pp. 772–773. ISBN 0-8032-1160-0.
- Friedman, Reva C.; Rogers, Karen B., eds. (2002). Talent in Context: Historical and Social Perspectives on Giftedness. Washington, DC: American Psychological Association. ISBN 978-1-55798-944-4.
- Gallagher, Sherri L.; Sullivan, Amanda L. (2011). "Chapter 30: Kaufman Assessment Battery for Children, Second Edition". In Davis, Andrew (ed.). Handbook of Pediatric Neuropsychology. New York: Springer Publishing. pp. 343–352. ISBN 978-0-8261-0629-2.
- Georgas, James; Weiss, Lawrence; van de Vijver, Fons; Saklofske, Donald (2003). "Preface". In Georgas, James; Weiss, Lawrence; van de Vijver, Fons; Saklofske, Donald (eds.). Culture and Children's Intelligence: Cross-Cultural Analysis of the WISC-III. San Diego, CA: Academic Press. pp. xvx–xxxii. ISBN 978-0-12-280055-9.
- Gleick, James (2011). Genius: The Life and Science of Richard Feynman (ebook ed.). Open Road Media. ISBN 978-1-4532-1043-7.
- Gottfredson, Linda S. (2009). "Chapter 1: Logical Fallacies Used to Dismiss the Evidence on Intelligence Testing". In Phelps, Richard F. (ed.). Correcting Fallacies about Educational and Psychological Testing. Washington, DC: American Psychological Association. ISBN 978-1-4338-0392-5.
- Gregory, Robert J. (1995). "Classification of Intelligence". In Sternberg, Robert J. (ed.). Encyclopedia of human intelligence. Vol. 1. Macmillan. pp. 260–266. ISBN 978-0-02-897407-1. OCLC 29594474.
- Groth-Marnat, Gary (2009). Handbook of Psychological Assessment (Fifth ed.). Hoboken, NJ: Wiley. ISBN 978-0-470-08358-1.
- Heller, Kurt A.; Mönks, Franz J.; Sternberg, Robert J.; Subotnik, Rena F., eds. (2000). International Handbook of Giftedness and Talent (2nd ed.). Amsterdam: Pergamon. ISBN 978-0-08-043796-5.
- Holahan, Carole K.; Sears, Robert R.; Cronbach, Lee J. (1995). The Gifted Group in Later Maturity (first ed.). Stanford, CA: Stanford University Press. ISBN 978-0-8047-2407-4.
  - Ellen Idler (July 1996). "Reviewed Work: The Gifted Group in Later Maturity". American Journal of Sociology. 102 (1): 316–318. JSTOR 2782225.
- Frances Degen, Horowitz; O'Brien, Marion, eds. (1985). The Gifted and talented: developmental perspectives. American Psychological Association. ISBN 978-0-912704-94-4. LCCN 85007559. OCLC 11972824.
- Horowitz, Frances Degen; Subotnik, Rena F.; Matthews, Dona J., eds. (2009). The Development of Giftedness and Talent Across the Life Span. Washington, DC: American Psychological Association. ISBN 978-1-4338-0414-4.
- Hunt, Earl (2011). Human Intelligence. Cambridge: Cambridge University Press. ISBN 978-0-521-70781-7.
- Jensen, Arthur R. (1998). The g Factor: The Science of Mental Ability. Human Evolution, Behavior, and Intelligence. Westport, CT: Praeger. ISBN 978-0-275-96103-9. ISSN 1063-2158.
  - Charles Locurto (1999). "A Balance Sheet on Persistence". Psycoloquy (Review). 10 (59).
- Jensen, Arthur R. (2011). "The Theory of Intelligence and Its Measurement". Intelligence. 39 (4): 171–177. doi:10.1016/j.intell.2011.03.004. ISSN 0160-2896.
- Johnsen, Susan K. (May 2011). Identifying Gifted Students: A Practical Guide (2nd ed.). Waco, Texas: Prufrock Press. ISBN 978-1-59363-701-9.
- Kamphaus, Randy W. (2005). Clinical Assessment of Child and Adolescent Intelligence (Second ed.). New York: Springer. ISBN 978-0-387-26299-4.
- Kamphaus, Randy; Winsor, Ann Pierce; Rowe, Ellen W.; Kim, Songwon (2012). "Chapter 2: A History of Intelligence Test Interpretation". In Flanagan, Dawn P.; Harrison, Patti L. (eds.). Contemporary Intellectual Assessment: Theories, tests, and issues (Third ed.). New York: Guilford Press. pp. 56–70. ISBN 978-1-60918-995-2.
- Kaufman, Alan S. (2009). IQ Testing 101. New York: Springer Publishing. pp. 151–153. ISBN 978-0-8261-0629-2.
- Kaufman, Alan S.; Lichtenberger, Elizabeth O.; Fletcher-Janzen, Elaine; Kaufman, Nadeen L. (2005). Essentials of KABC-II Assessment. Hoboken, NJ: Wiley. ISBN 978-0-471-66733-9.
- Kaufman, Alan S.; Lichtenberger, Elizabeth O. (2006). Assessing Adolescent and Adult Intelligence (3rd ed.). Hoboken, NJ: Wiley. ISBN 978-0-471-73553-3.
- Kaufman, Scott Barry (1 June 2013). Ungifted: Intelligence Redefined. Basic Books. ISBN 978-0-465-02554-1.
  - "Ungifted: Intelligence Redefined: The Truth about Talent, Practice, Creativity, and the Many Paths to Greatness". Publishers Weekly (Review).
- Lang, Margherita; Matta, Michael; Parolin, Laura; Morrone, Cristina; Pezzuti, Lina (2017). "Cognitive Profile of Intellectually Gifted Adults: Analyzing the Wechsler Adult Intelligence Scale". Assessment. 26 (5): 929–943. doi:10.1177/1073191117733547. PMID 28948838. S2CID 35100607.
- Leslie, Mitchell (July–August 2000). "The Vexing Legacy of Lewis Terman". Stanford Magazine. Archived from the original on 26 August 2021.
- Levine, Albert J.; Marks, Louis (1928). Testing Intelligence and Achievement. Macmillan. OCLC 1437258.
- Lohman, David F.; Foley Nicpon, Megan (2012). "Chapter 12: Ability Testing & Talent Identification" (PDF). In Hunsaker, Scott (ed.). Identification: The Theory and Practice of Identifying Students for Gifted and Talented Education Services. Waco, TX: Prufrock. pp. 287–386. ISBN 978-1-931280-17-4. Archived from the original (PDF) on 2016-03-15.
- Mackintosh, N. J. (2011). IQ and Human Intelligence (second ed.). Oxford: Oxford University Press. ISBN 978-0-19-958559-5. LCCN 2010941708.
- Matarazzo, Joseph D. (1972). Wechsler's Measurement and Appraisal of Adult Intelligence (fifth and enlarged ed.). Baltimore, MD: Williams & Witkins.
  - R. D. Savage (April 1974). "Wechsler's Measurement and Appraisal of Adult Intelligence, 5th ed". British Journal of Industrial Medicine (Review). 31 (2): 169. PMC 1009574.
- McIntosh, David E.; Dixon, Felicia A.; Pierson, Eric E. (2012). "Chapter 25: Use of Intelligence Tests in the Identification of Giftedness". In Flanagan, Dawn P.; Harrison, Patti L. (eds.). Contemporary Intellectual Assessment: Theories, tests, and issues (Third ed.). New York: Guilford Press. pp. 623–642. ISBN 978-1-60918-995-2.
- Meyer, Robert G.; Weaver, Christopher M. (2005). Law and Mental Health: A Case-Based Approach. New York: Guilford Press. ISBN 978-1-59385-221-4.
- Naglieri, Jack A. (1999). Essentials of CAS Assessment. Essentials of Psychological Assessment. Hoboken, NJ: Wiley. ISBN 978-0-471-29015-5.
- Park, Gregory; Lubinski, David; Benbow, Camilla P. (2 November 2010). "Recognizing Spatial Intelligence". Scientific American.
- Phillipson, Shane N.; McCann, Maria, eds. (2007). Conceptions of Giftedness: Sociocultural Perspectives. Mahwah, NJ: Lawrence Erlbaum. ISBN 978-0-8058-5751-1.
- Pickover, Clifford A. (1998). Strange Brains and Genius: The Secret Lives of Eccentric Scientists and Madmen. Plenum Publishing Corporation. ISBN 978-0-688-16894-0.
- Pintner, Rudolph (1931). Intelligence Testing: Methods and Results. New York: Henry Holt.
- Plucker, Jonathan A.; Callahan, Carolyn M., eds. (2008). Critical Issues and Practices in Gifted Education: What the Research Says. Waco, TX: Prufrock Press. ISBN 978-1-59363-295-3.
- Reynolds, Cecil; Kamphaus, Randy (2003). "Reynolds Intellectual Assessment Scales™ (RIAS™)". PAR(Psychological Assessment Resources). Archived from the original (PowerPoint) on 9 October 2021.
- Reynolds, Cecil R.; Horton, Arthur M. (2012). "Chapter 3: Basic Psychometrics and Test Selection for an Independent Pediatric Forensic Neuropsychology Evaluation". In Sherman, Elizabeth M.; Brooks, Brian L. (eds.). Pediatric Forensic Neuropsychology (Third ed.). Oxford: Oxford University Press. pp. 41–65. ISBN 978-0-19-973456-6.
- Robinson, Andrew (2011). Genius: A Very Short Introduction. Oxford: Oxford University Press. ISBN 978-0-19-959440-5.
  - GrrlScientist (3 March 2011). "Genius: A Very Short Introduction [Book Review]". The Guardian.
- Rogers, Karen B. (2002). Re-Forming Gifted Education: Matching the Program to the Child. Scottsdale, AZ: Great Potential Press. ISBN 978-0-910707-46-6.
- Saklofske, Donald; Weiss, Lawrence; Beal, A. Lynne; Coalson, Diane (2003). "Chapter 1: The Wechsler Scales for Assessing Children's Intelligence: Past to Present". In Georgas, James; Weiss, Lawrence; van de Vijver, Fons; Saklofske, Donald (eds.). Culture and Children's Intelligence: Cross-Cultural Analysis of the WISC-III. San Diego, CA: Academic Press. pp. 3–21. ISBN 978-0-12-280055-9.
- Sattler, Jerome M. (1988). Assessment of Children (Third ed.). San Diego, CA: Jerome M. Sattler, Publisher. ISBN 978-0-9618209-0-9.
- Sattler, Jerome M. (2001). Assessment of Children: Cognitive Applications (Fourth ed.). San Diego, CA: Jerome M. Sattler, Publisher. ISBN 978-0-9618209-7-8.
- Sattler, Jerome M. (2008). Assessment of Children: Cognitive Foundations. La Mesa, CA: Jerome M. Sattler, Publisher. ISBN 978-0-9702671-4-6.
- Shurkin, Joel (1992). Terman's Kids: The Groundbreaking Study of How the Gifted Grow Up. Boston, MA: Little, Brown. ISBN 978-0-316-78890-8.
  - Frederic Golden (May 31, 1992). "Tracking the IQ Elite: TERMAN'S KIDS: The Groundbreaking Study of How the Gifted Grow Up, By Joel N. Shurkin". Los Angeles Times. Archived from the original on 2012-11-08.
- Shurkin, Joel (2006). Broken Genius: The Rise and Fall of William Shockley, Creator of the Electronic Age. London: Macmillan. ISBN 978-1-4039-8815-7.
  - Brian Clegg. "Review - Broken Genius - Joel Shurkin". Popular Science. Archived from the original on 2006-10-06.
- Simonton, Dean Keith (1999). Origins of genius: Darwinian perspectives on creativity. Oxford: Oxford University Press. ISBN 978-0-19-512879-6. JSTOR 3080746.
- Sternberg, Robert J., ed. (2000). Handbook of Intelligence. Cambridge: Cambridge University Press. ISBN 978-0-521-59648-0.
- Sternberg, Robert J. (2004). International Handbook of Intelligence. Cambridge: Cambridge University Press. ISBN 978-0-521-00402-2.
- Sternberg, Robert J.; Davidson, Janet E., eds. (2005). Conceptions of Giftedness. Cambridge: Cambridge University Press. ISBN 978-0-521-54730-7.
- Sternberg, Robert J.; Jarvin, Linda; Grigorenko, Elena L. (2010). Explorations in Giftedness. Cambridge: Cambridge University Press. ISBN 978-0-521-74009-8.
- Sternberg, Robert J.; Grigorenko, Elena L., eds. (2003). The Psychology of Abilities, Competencies, and Expertise (PDF). Cambridge: Cambridge University Press. ISBN 978-0-521-00776-4.
- Sternberg, Robert J.; Kaufman, Scott Barry, eds. (2011). The Cambridge Handbook of Intelligence. Cambridge: Cambridge University Press. ISBN 978-0-521-73911-5.
- Spearman, C. (April 1904). ""General Intelligence," Objectively Determined and Measured" (PDF). American Journal of Psychology. 15 (2): 201–292. doi:10.2307/1412107. JSTOR 1412107. Archived from the original (PDF) on 7 April 2014.
- Spearman, Charles (1927). The Abilities of Man: Their Nature and Measurement. New York: Macmillan.
- Strauss, Esther; Sherman, Elizabeth M.; Spreen, Otfried (2006). A Compendium of Neuropsychological Tests: Administration, Norms, and Commentary (Third ed.). Cambridge: Oxford University Press. ISBN 978-0-19-515957-8.
- Subotnik, Rena Faye; Arnold, Karen D., eds. (1994). Beyond Terman: Contemporary Longitudinal Studies of Giftedness and Talent. Norwood, NJ: Ablex. ISBN 978-1-56750-011-0.
- Tannenbaum, Abraham J. (1983). Gifted children: psychological and educational perspectives. Macmillan Publishing Company. ISBN 978-0-02-418880-9. LCCN 82004710.
- Terman, Lewis M. (1916). The Measurement of Intelligence: An Explanation of and a Complete Guide to the Use of the Stanford Revision and Extension of the Binet-Simon Intelligence Scale. Riverside Textbooks in Education. Ellwood P. Cubberley (Editor's Introduction). Boston: Houghton Mifflin. OCLC 186102.
- Terman, Lewis M. (1925). Mental and Physical Traits of a Thousand Gifted Children. Genetic Studies of Genius Volume 1. Stanford, CA: Stanford University Press. LCCN 25008797.
- Terman, Lewis Madison; Merrill, Maude A. (1937). Measuring intelligence: A guide to the administration of the new revised Stanford-Binet tests of intelligence. Riverside textbooks in education. Boston: Houghton Mifflin.
- Terman, Lewis M.; Oden, Melita (1947). The Gifted Child Grows Up: Twenty-five Years' Follow-up of a Superior Group. Genetic Studies of Genius Volume 4. Stanford, CA: Stanford University Press. LCCN 25008797.
- Terman, Lewis M.; Oden, Melita (1959). The Gifted Group at Mid-Life: Thirty-Five Years' Follow-Up of the Superior Child. Genetic Studies of Genius Volume V. Stanford, CA: Stanford University Press.
- Terman, Lewis Madison; Merrill, Maude A. (1973). Stanford-Binet Intelligence Scale: Manual for the Third Revision Form L-M with Revised IQ Tables by Samuel R. Pinneau. Houghton Mifflin Company tests. Samuel R. Pinneau (Revised IQ Tables, 1960), R. L. Thorndike (1972 Norms Tables) (1972 Norms ed.). Boston: Houghton Mifflin.
- Thompson, Bruce; Subotnik, Rena F., eds. (2010). Methodologies for Conducting Research on Giftedness. Robert J. Sternberg (Foreword). Washington, DC: American Psychological Association. ISBN 978-1-4338-0714-5.
- Ross, Pat O'Connell (1993). National excellence: A case for developing America's talent (PDF). Washington, DC: Office of Educational Research and Improvement, Department of Education. ISBN 978-0-16-042928-6. OCLC 29205332. ERIC ED359743.
- Urbina, Susana (2011). "Chapter 2: Tests of Intelligence". In Sternberg, Robert J.; Kaufman, Scott Barry (eds.). The Cambridge Handbook of Intelligence. Cambridge: Cambridge University Press. pp. 20–38. ISBN 978-0-521-73911-5.
- Uzieblo, Katarzyna; Winter, Jan; Vanderfaeillie, Johan; Rossi, Gina; Magez, Walter (2012). "Intelligent Diagnosing of Intellectual Disabilities in Offenders: Food for Thought" (PDF). Behavioral Sciences & the Law. 30 (1): 28–48. doi:10.1002/bsl.1990. PMID 22241548.
- Wasserman, John D. (2012). "Chapter 1: A History of Intelligence Assessment". In Flanagan, Dawn P.; Harrison, Patti L. (eds.). Contemporary Intellectual Assessment: Theories, tests, and issues (Third ed.). New York: Guilford Press. pp. 3–55. ISBN 978-1-60918-995-2.
- Wechsler, David (1939). The Measurement of Adult Intelligence. Baltimore: Williams & Witkins. LCCN 39014016.
- Wechsler, David (1939). The Measurement of Adult Intelligence (first ed.). Baltimore: Williams & Witkins. LCCN 39014016.
- Weiss, Lawrence G.; Saklofske, Donald H.; Prifitera, Aurelio; Holdnack, James A., eds. (2006). WISC-IV Advanced Clinical Interpretation. Practical Resources for the Mental Health Professional. Burlington, MA: Academic Press. ISBN 978-0-12-088763-7.
- Wolman, Benjamin B., ed. (1985). Handbook of Intelligence. consulting editors: Douglas K. Detterman, Alan S. Kaufman, Joseph D. Matarazzo. New York: Wiley. ISBN 978-0-471-89738-5.
- Woodrow, Herbert Hollingworth (1919). Brightness and Dullness in Children. J. B. Lippincott Company. Archived from the original on 30 September 2012.
  - "Reviewed Work: Brightness and Dullness in Children. Lippincott's Educational Guides". The Elementary School Journal. 20 (6): 469–471. February 1920. doi:10.1086/454779. JSTOR 994141.
