= Davidson Academy (Reno, Nevada) =

Davidson Academy of Nevada
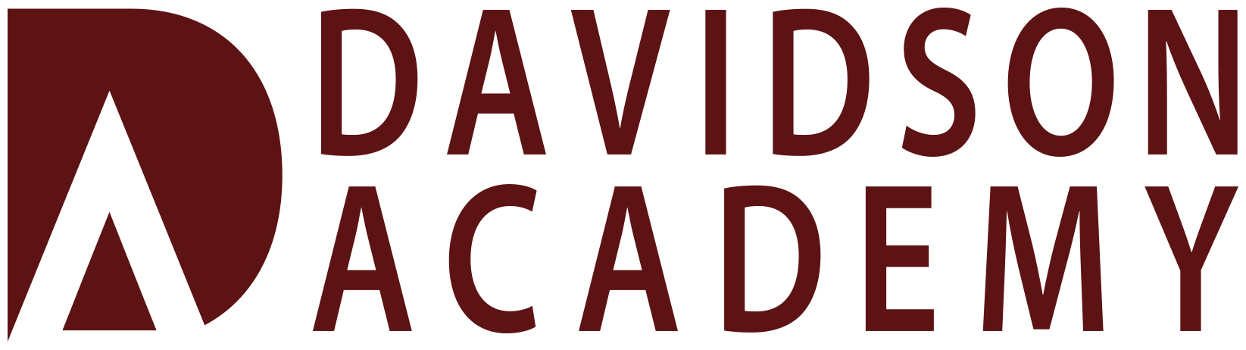

Location
- 1164 N Virginia St; Reno, Nevada 89503; United States; 39°32′20″N 119°48′59″W

Information
- Type: Public school
- Established: 2006
- Director: Colleen Harsin (Reno)
- Grades: 5–12
- Enrollment: 182 (2024–25)
- Colors: Maroon and gray
- Mascot: Phoenix
- Website: davidsonacademy.unr.edu

The Davidson Academy of Nevada, commonly referred to as the Davidson Academy, the DA, or the Academy is a public school in Reno, Nevada on the University of Nevada, Reno, campus. The school is a division of the Davidson Institute for Talent Development, a nonprofit organization established to support gifted children.

Founded in 2006, the school is the first public school in the United States for gifted students, a unique classification in the Nevada Legislature. As of the 2024–25 school year, 169 students are enrolled in the school's Reno campus and 100 students are enrolled in the online campus, launched in the 2017–18 school year.

The school groups students by ability, rather than age, and allows students to take courses at any level, including university-level coursework as part of a dual-enrollment program with the University of Nevada, Reno. The school was designed with the purpose "to provide profoundly gifted young people an advanced educational opportunity matched to their abilities, strengths and interests." Eligible candidates must score at or above the 99.9th percentile on accepted intelligence and/or achievement tests (about 145 on traditional IQ tests); perform at a required academic level; exhibit intellectual and academic achievement; be, or intend to be, residents of Nevada; and pass other criteria such as an in-person assessment.

== Academics ==
The school was ranked as the "best public high school in America" by Niche in 2024 and the 4th best public high school in America by U.S. News. According to The Washington Post's Jay Mathews, the Davidson Academy is one of the nation's "top-performing schools with elite students," and its students have the highest average ACT score of any public high school in the United States. The school's average class size is 10.

The school's director is Colleen Harsin, serving in that position since the school's inception. The director of curriculum is Erin Vienneau.

The average class size is less than 15 students, with some classes as small as 3–4 students. Courses offered include advanced mathematics classes (including differential equations), Spanish and Chinese language classes, as well as various electives such as machine learning and animation. Students can enroll in classes not offered by the school through dual enrollment with the University of Nevada, Reno, where students are encouraged to enroll when their abilities or interests exceed the school's offerings. Some students take even graduate-level classes, with most Academy graduates taking upper-division UNR classes before graduation.

== History ==
The school's Reno campus was founded following state legislation passed in 2005 providing for the creation of a "university school for profoundly gifted pupils." Bob and Jan Davidson, former owners of Davidson & Associates and supporters of gifted education, established the school as an outgrowth of the Davidson Young Scholars program following requests by many of the parents in the program to establish a full-time school, with some saying they would move for their students to attend.

An online campus was launched in the 2017–18 academic year. The online option provides profoundly gifted students in the United States and Canada a "rigorous online academic environment where these students can thrive among their intellectual peers." The online campus has since spun off as a separate entity.

== Awards and honors ==
- Consistently ranked as one of the nation's "top-performing schools with elite students" by the Washington Post's Jay Mathews.
- Ranked #1 public high school in America by Niche.com.
- 16 out of 25 seniors were named 2024 National Merit Scholarship semifinalists.
- 2016, 2020, 2021, 2022, 2023, 2024, 2025, and 2026 winners of the Nevada Science Bowl. Placed 2nd in the nation at the National Science Bowl finals in D.C. in 2026.
- One presidential scholar in 2014, 2015, 2016, and 2020, and two presidential scholars in 2017.
- 2023 and 2024 winners of the Nevada Mathcounts competition.
- 2017, 2018, 2022, and 2024 "Elite Eight" team in the International Public Policy Forum.
- The school's DECA chapter regularly sends about half of its students to DECA's International Career Development Conference.

== Notable alumni ==
- Taylor Wilson (born 1994), nuclear scientist and youngest person to build a working Farnsworth–Hirsch fusor.
