= Academic acceleration =

Moving students through education faster than typical

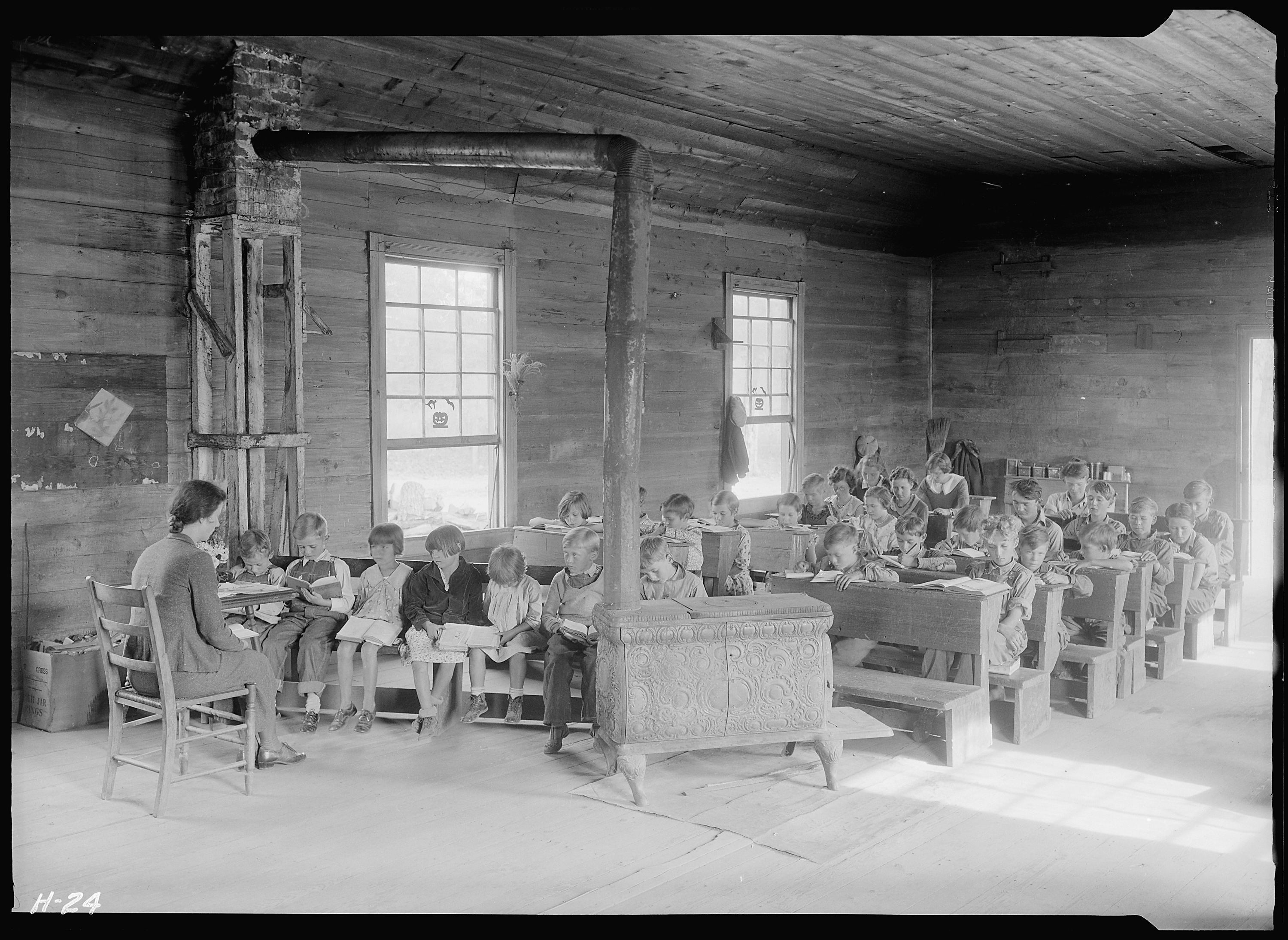
A one-room schoolhouse, the original multi-age classroom

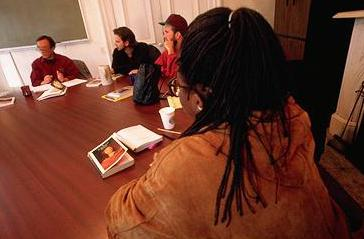
A discussion class at Shimer College, which has offered an early entrance program since 1950

Academic acceleration is moving students through an educational program at a rate faster or at an age younger than is typical. Students who would benefit from acceleration do not necessarily need to be identified as gifted in a particular subject. Acceleration places them ahead of where they would be in the regular school curriculum. It has been described as a "fundamental need" for gifted students as it provides students with level-appropriate material. The practice occurs worldwide. The bulk of educational research on academic acceleration has been within the United States.

== Impact ==
Well-administered academic acceleration programs have been generally found to be highly beneficial to students. For example, accelerated students outperform peers on a variety of measures, including grades in school, future university status and grades, career achievements, and performance assessments. Effective administration involves ensuring student readiness, both academic and social-emotional, and providing necessary support and resources. Cohort acceleration programs, in which a number of students are accelerated together at the same time, are often especially effective. However, acceleration programs often face difficulty due to many teachers, administrators and parents being skeptical of the benefits of acceleration. This is because teacher education programs do not often present information about acceleration, even though there are decades of research demonstrating that acceleration is a successful educational option for talented students. Adults who have experienced acceleration themselves, however, tend to be very well-disposed to the practice.

The influential 2004 U.S. report A Nation Deceived articulated 20 benefits of academic acceleration, which can be further distilled into four key points:

1. Academic acceleration provides greater benefits for academically talented students than any other approach, such as differentiated instruction or enrichment.
2. Research has provided no evidence of social or emotional maladjustment due to acceleration. Accelerated students are about as well-adjusted socially as their non-accelerated classmates.
3. Academic acceleration contributes to meeting a gifted student's social and emotional needs by providing a better-matched peer group.
4. Failure to accelerate a student who is able to accelerate may have adverse effects on motivation and productivity, and may even lead to dropping out.

The 2015 follow-up to that report, A Nation Empowered, highlights the research that has occurred over the past decade, and provides further evidence that academic acceleration, when applied correctly, can be highly beneficial for gifted students.

== Research ==
One of the major concerns noted about acceleration is the impact on socialization. A longitudinal study conducted over 35 years and published in 2020 in the Journal of Educational Psychology from Vanderbilt's Study of Mathematically Precocious Youth finds that there are no effects on the long-term well-being of gifted youth from academic acceleration such as skipping grades, graduating early, or a combination of advanced educational placement methods. In fact, the authors stated that such concerns are "fruitless."

== Types ==
There are at least 18 forms of academic acceleration.

- Acceleration in college

The student completes two or more majors in a total of four years and/or earns an advanced degree along with or in lieu of a bachelor's degree. Academic acceleration also occurs at the graduate and professional level, with dual degree programs and combined bachelor's-professional programs such as accelerated JD programs.

- Advanced Placement

Advanced Placement is a program unique to the United States and Canada, originally developed by the Fund for the Advancement of Education and now administered by the College Board.

- Concurrent or dual enrollment

In dual enrollment, the student is simultaneously enrolled in two separate, academically related institutions, most commonly a high school and community college or university. One sub-type of dual enrollment is concurrent enrollment, in which the student simultaneously receives both high school and college credit for a single course. Dual enrollment programs can allow students to graduate early, or to enter college with advanced standing.

- Combined classes

A combined class is one that combines two adjacent grades. While not, in and of itself, a practice designed for acceleration, in some instances this placement can allow younger students to interact academically and socially with older peers.

- Continuous progress

In continuous progress education, the student is given content progressively as prior content is completed and mastered, moving on to more advanced material as soon as the student is ready for it.

- Curriculum compacting

Curriculum compacting involves analyzing an assigned curriculum unit, determining which parts of it a student has already mastered, and providing replacement strategies so that the student can complete the unit without repeating this already-mastered material. In a compacted curriculum, the student's instruction entails reduced amounts of introductory activities, drill, and practice. Instructional experiences may also be based on relatively fewer instructional objectives compared to the general curriculum. The time gained may be used for more advanced content instruction or to participate in enrichment activities. Curricular compacting not only saves time, but also reduces student boredom and apathy.

- Distance learning

As with extracurricular acceleration, when using distance or correspondence courses, the student enrolls in coursework delivered outside of normal school instruction. Instruction may be delivered traditionally by mail, but increasingly online courses are used. Effective use of distance learning requires a high degree of independence and motivation.

- Early graduation from high school or college

In early graduation, the student graduates from high school or college in three-and-a-half years or less. Generally, this is accomplished by increasing the amount of coursework undertaken each year in high school or college, but it may also be accomplished through dual/concurrent enrollment or extracurricular and correspondence coursework. In the United States, however, some states do not allow early graduation.

- Early entrance to college

Early entrance to college, sometimes called "early admission", is the practice of allowing high school students to enter college one or more years before the traditional age of college entrance, and without obtaining a high school diploma. In some cases this is done individually, and many universities and colleges allow such admissions on a case-by-case basis. However, it is also often done as part of a cohort acceleration program, in which many such students are accelerated into college together at the same time. These programs may provide their students with a social support network and help in dealing with the adjustment.

Early entrance programs take a number of forms. Some, like the Advanced Academy of Georgia and The Clarkson School, are special programs within larger colleges. In others, like the Early Entrant Program at Shimer College and the Early Entrance Program at CSULA, early entrants study side-by-side with traditional college students. Bard College at Simon's Rock is a four-year college designed exclusively for early entrants.

- Early admission to kindergarten

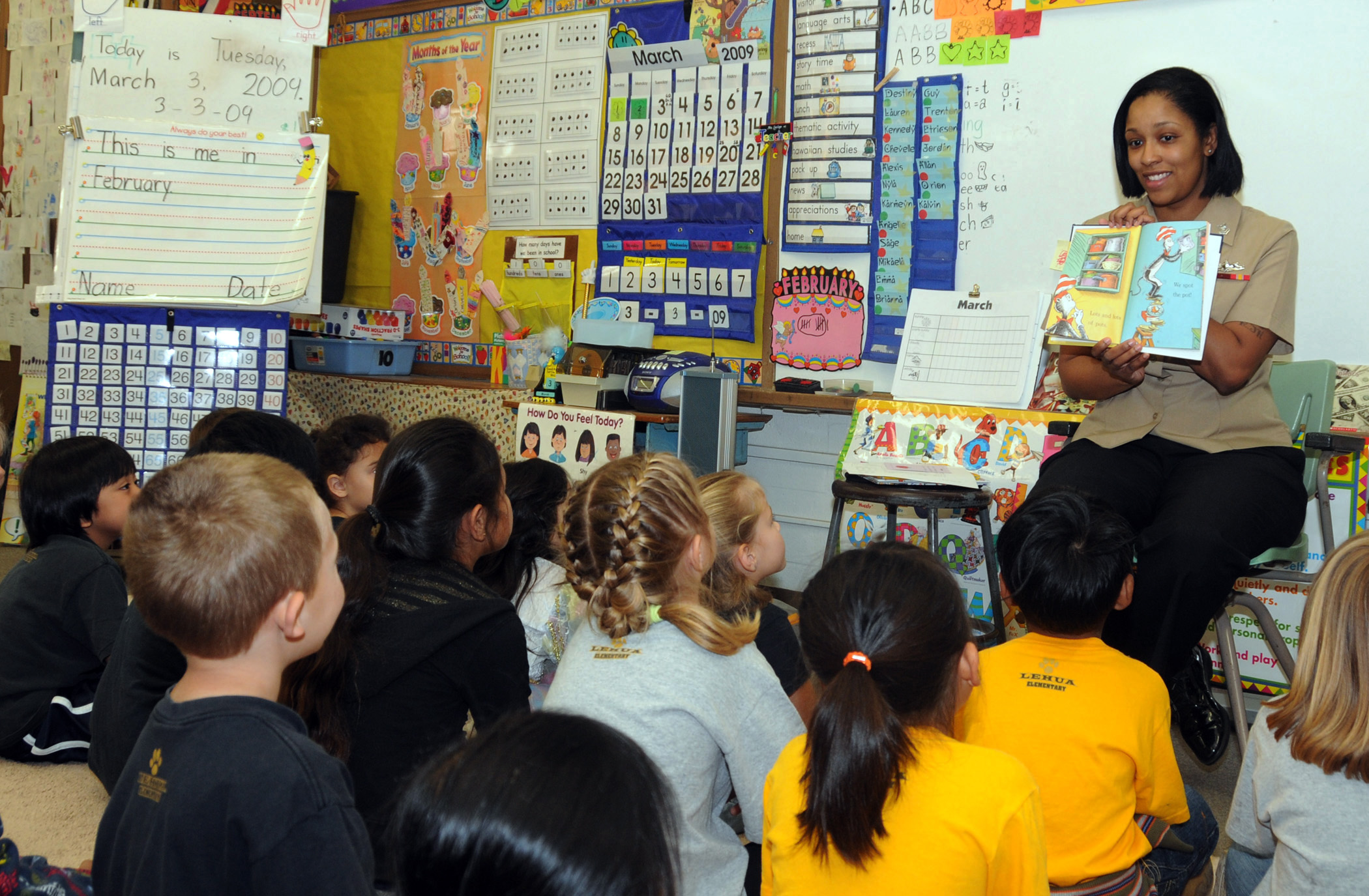
A kindergarten class

In early admission to kindergarten, students enter kindergarten prior to the minimum age for school entry as set by district or state policy. This form of acceleration poses fewer obstacles than others, as places the student in a peer group with whom the student is likely to remain for some time. In many US school districts, early admission requires evaluation, which may include a mock class to test emotional readiness.

- Early admission to first grade: often occurring where early admission to kindergarten is not permitted. This practice can result from either the skipping of kindergarten, or from accelerating the student from kindergarten in what would be the student's first year of school. This second approach, of skipping kindergarten entirely, is however often resisted by US school administrators.
- Early entrance to middle school or high school: Early entrance to high school enables the student to avoid being stuck in the "holding pattern" of middle school.
- Grade skipping

One of the best-known forms of academic acceleration, grade skipping involves moving the student ahead one or more grades. Where grade skipping is inappropriate, other forms of acceleration may be recommended instead.

One metric used for determining whether grade skipping is appropriate is the research-based Iowa Acceleration Scale, which entered its third edition in 2009. In particular, the IAS identifies four conditions under which grade skipping is unwise:

1. If the student's intelligence quotient is less than 120 (i.e. less than one standard deviation above the mean)
2. If the student has a sibling in the student's current grade
3. If the student has a sibling in the grade into which the student would accelerate
4. If the student does not want to skip a grade
- Extracurricular programs

In extracurricular acceleration, students elect to enroll in weekend, after-school or summer programs that confer advanced instruction and/or credit. In some cases this will allow especially radical acceleration in content, such as a primary-school student taking university-level extension classes.

- Self-paced instruction

In self-paced instruction, the student proceeds through learning and instructional activities at a self-selected pace. Self-paced instruction differs from continuous progress instruction in that the student has a greater degree of control.

- Credit by examination

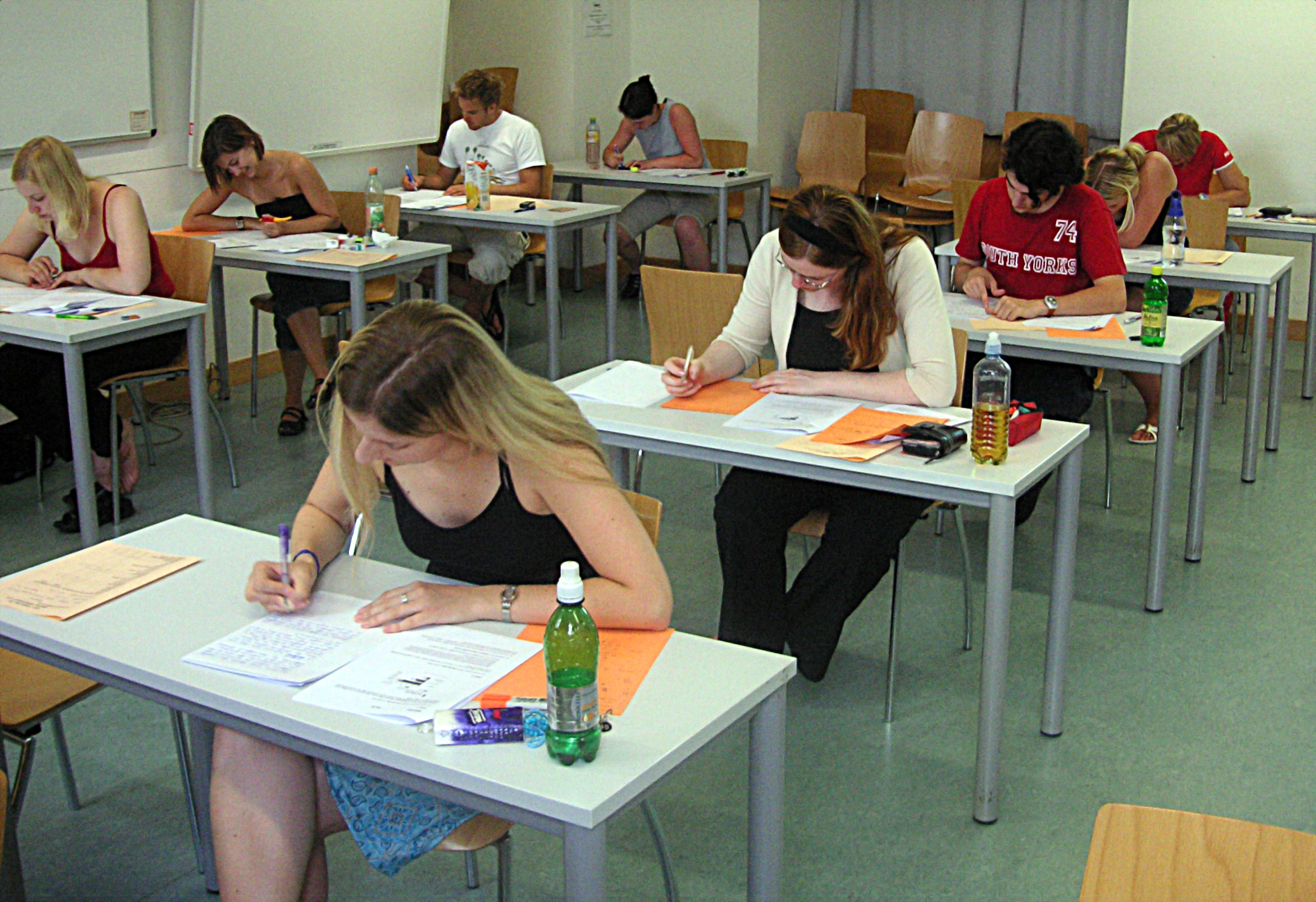
Students taking a test at the University of Vienna

Often referred to as "testing out", credit by examination involves giving a student advanced standing credit (e.g., in high school or college) for successfully completing some form of mastery test or activity. Studies of gifted college students suggest that this may have slightly negative effects on psychological well-being.

- Multi-age classrooms

Classrooms with students of diverse ages allow younger gifted students to be grouped with older students who are closer to their academic level. They also create opportunities for peer instruction, leading to heightened self-esteem in gifted students.

- Telescoping curriculum

In a telescoped curriculum, the student is provided instruction that entails less time than is normal (e. g., completing a one-year course in one semester, or three years of middle school in two). Telescoping differs from curriculum compacting in that time saved from telescoping results in advanced grade placement.

- Subject-matter acceleration/partial acceleration

This practice allows students to be placed with classes with older peers for a part of the day (or with materials from higher grade placements) in one or more content areas. Effective subject-matter acceleration requires the cooperation of teachers in subsequent grades, so that the student is not forced to repeat the material. Important points about subject acceleration include credit and placement. The student should receive credit for work completed, and the student should be placed in the next level of a course after successfully completing a course. More information about subject acceleration is provided on the Acceleration Institute website.

- Mentoring

In mentoring, a student is paired with a mentor or expert tutor who provides advanced or more rapid pacing of instruction. Mentoring of gifted high school students by successful adults often has beneficial long-term effects, including improved focus on career goals. The career effects are especially pronounced for women students.

== Making decisions about acceleration ==
A number of tools have been developed to help educators and families make decisions about academic acceleration.

- The Acceleration Institute website provides many resources about acceleration, including research articles, free resources, and other information useful to parents, educators, policymakers, and researchers.
- The Iowa Acceleration Scale is a paper-and-pencil tool designed to help educators gather relevant information and conduct a team meeting with educators, administrators, and parents and determine if acceleration (specifically, a grade-skip) is a good match for a particular student. This tool is widely accepted in gifted education (for example, the State of Ohio requires its use for students considered for whole-grade acceleration). However, it was last updated in 2009.
- The Integrated Acceleration System, launched in 2021, is an online platform that assists educators and families in working their way through the process of decision-making about acceleration. It guides participants through the integration of information about acceleration. Informed by decades of research, it includes all of the major factors to consider when making a decision and produces a report about readiness for one of the many forms of acceleration, including grade-skipping, early entrance to kindergarten, subject acceleration, and early entrance to college. Authors of this tool are Susan Assouline and Ann Lupkowski-Shoplik.
- Above-level testing, in which a student takes a test designed for older students, is frequently used to determine a student's readiness for subject acceleration.
- Educational policy helps to ensure that acceleration is offered to all students who might benefit from it, not just those who have parents advocating for them. Information about developing academic acceleration policies can be found in the publication, Developing Academic Acceleration Policies: Whole Grade, Early Entrance, and Single Subject.

== Inequalities and critiques ==
Before reading the information below, we should note that students can (and should) be considered for academic acceleration whether or not they are labeled "gifted." The gifted label is not a prerequisite for consideration for academic acceleration. See Assouline et al., 2015 for more information. (Assouline, S. G., Colangelo, N., VanTassel-Baska, J., & Lupkowski-Shoplik, A. E. (Eds.). (2015). A nation empowered: Evidence trumps the excuses that hold back America’s brightest students (Vol. 2). University of Iowa Belin-Blank Center.)

Citations in the following paragraphs focus on data reported about students labeled "gifted." Research has found that nearly half of academically talented students (as measured by high scores on above-level tests) are not labeled "gifted" by their schools.

Academic acceleration and gifted programs more broadly face critique for significant and consistent under-representation of minority students - particularly students of African American and Latino descent. In 2009, African Americans comprised 16.7% of students in general education but only 9.9% of students in gifted programs, and Latino students 22.3% of general education but only 15.4% of gifted programs. In a majority of gifted programs, the first step is referral from a teacher. However, few teachers are trained in identification and thus rely on academic metrics, a metric some argue is biased towards White students due to systemic inequities in intelligence assessment. A significant majority of states use some form of standardized or aptitude test. African American, Latino and Indigenous students consistently perform lower on these exams due to a variety of cultural and institutional reasons.

Numerous potential solutions have been proposed and tried with varying degrees of success and continuation. Implicit biases and cultural differences contribute to the mis-categorization or oversight of African American, Latino and other students of color. Furthermore, universal testing and screening of students raises the representation of minority students but can face significant resource constraints. However, theories of multiple intelligence have also now led to calls for removal of IQ tests as a standard metric of giftedness. IQ tests prioritize a set binary of intelligence factors which often discounts experiential and contextual expressions. Attempts to lessen racial inequality in programs of academic acceleration and gifted education continue in experiments across the United States.

== Policies ==
The Acceleration Institute includes a section on state policies relevant to acceleration.

The document, Developing Academic Acceleration Policies, helps schools and school districts develop fair and equitable acceleration policies.

- Illinois state policy specifically permits acceleration.
- Minnesota state policy specifically permits acceleration.
- Ohio state policy specifically permits acceleration.
- Wisconsin state policy specifically permits acceleration.

== Works cited ==
- Balchin, Tom; Hymer, Barry; Matthews, Dona J., eds. (2013). The Routledge International Companion to Gifted Education. ISBN 978-1136028861.
- Brody, Linda E. (2004). Grouping and Acceleration Practices in Gifted Education. ISBN 1483363260.
- Callahan, Carolyn M.; Hertberg-Davis, Holly L. (2012). Fundamentals of Gifted Education: Considering Multiple Perspectives. ISBN 978-0415881494.
- Colangelo, Nicholas; Assouline, Susan (2009). "Acceleration: Meeting the Academic and Social Needs of Students". In Shavinina, Larisa V. (ed.). International Handbook on Giftedness. Vol. 1. pp. 1085–1098. ISBN 978-1402061622.
- Gilman, Barbara Jackson (2008). Academic Advocacy for Gifted Children: A Parent's Complete Guide. ISBN 978-0910707886.
- Kerr, Barbara (2009). Encyclopedia of Giftedness, Creativity, and Talent. ISBN 978-1452266121.
- Merrotsy, Peter (2008). "Acceleration". In Salkind, Neil J. (ed.). Encyclopedia of Educational Psychology. Vol. 1. pp. 4–7. ISBN 978-1452265834.
- Smutny, Joan Franklin; Walker, Sally; Meckstroth, Elizabeth A. Y. (2006). Acceleration for Gifted Learners, K-5. ISBN 1483364062.
