= Si-e Tir street =

Historical street in Tehran

Si-e Tir Street خیابان سی‌ تیر
- Length: 1 km (0.62 mi)
- Location: Tehran
- North end: Jomhuri
- South end: Imam Khomeini

Si-e Tir street (Persian: خیابان سی تیر) or Qavam Street (Persian: خیابان قوام) is a historical and walk down street in central Tehran, Iran. It is bordered to the south by Imam Khomeini street and City Park and to the north by Jomhuri Street, Mirza Kuchik Khan street and Neauphle-le-Château street.

Si-e Tir means 30th Tir and corresponds with July 21 and is named after the date of the massive pro-Mohammad Mossadegh uprising against Mohammad Reza Shah Pahlavi in 1952 in which dozens of people were killed.

It is famous and known as religious street for locating a synagogue, a mosque, two Christian churches and a Zoroastrian fire temple along it: Haim Synagogue, Saint Peter Church and Adorian fire temple. in addition, there are some most important museums of Tehran in it: National Museum of Iran, Abgineh Museum of Tehran, the old building of National Library of Iran and some other historical complexes.
