= Mahmoud Mehrmohammadi =

Iranian educator (born 1959)

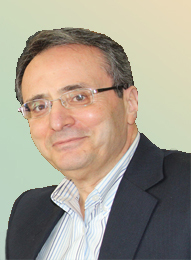
- Born: February 2, 1959 (age 67); Tehran, Iran

Philosophical work
- Institutions: Tarbiat Modares University
- Main interests: Teacher Education, human resource development
- Website: mehrmohammadi.ir

Mahmoud Mehrmohammadi (Persian: محمود مهرمحمدی) is an Iranian educational scholar, curriculum theorist and faculty member of Tarbiat Modares University. The domain of his activities and studies is education.

== Biography ==
Mahmoud Mehrmohammadi was born on February 2, 1959, in Tehran. He graduated from high school in 1975 and went to the US to continue his studies. He obtained a BS in industrial technology, building construction in 1979 from California State University- Fresno. He then went to San Jose, California to study for his master's degree. Majoring this time in the field of education, he opted to study educational technology and obtained his degree 1n 1981. For his PhD, he chose University of Southern California (USC) and studied in the department of Curriculum and Instruction from 1985 to 1987.

Upon returning home he assumed the position of the director for the Center for Educational Planning in the ministry of higher education and taught simultaneously in many universities. He is former chancellor of a national teacher education university named Farhangian University. He has published about ten books and around 100 papers in the field. Most of his works aim at offering a new perspective about commonplaces of the education system.

Mehrmohammadi was among hundreds of academic faculty who signed a letter condemning the government's crackdown of the 2025–2026 Iranian protests, and failure to prevent a future attack on Iran by the United States and Israel in response to the crackdown.

== Scientific works (in English) ==
- International Journals: 1- 'Needs Based Curriculum Development Process', International Research Journal of Arts and Humanities, Vol. 36, No. 36, pp. 59–51
- Refereed International Conference Proceedings: 1-'Internet and the Muslim Youth: Challenges, paradigms and strategies', Regional Seminar to Consider Ways to Immunize Children against Harmful Internet Content, Malaysia. 2-'Imaginative Perception: The Hallmark of Reflective Action ', IAACS Triennial Conference, 00/00/2009, South Africa.
- Papers: The Place of Neuroscience in Curriculum Thought and Practice, Recognition of "technology education" as a null aspect of school, A Conceptual Framework for Popularizing Science in Muslim societies, Teaching and Learning Road Map for Schools: Global and yet Local!, Upside down Curriculum Design (UDCD): A Novel Strategy in Making Curricular Decisions in Professional Fields of Study, A Comparative Analysis of Ghazali and Egan's Views on Imagination and Education: the Mythic Understanding and Children Learning, Needs-Based Curriculum Development Process: A Multilevel Conception, Toward a New Conception of Educated Person...

== Awards ==
- Outstanding Professor at Tarbiat Modares University, 2004, Tarbiat Modares University
- Outstanding researcher award, 2012, International Farabi Festival on the Humanities and Islamic Studies
- Outstanding professor award at the national level, Humanitis, 2008, Ministry of Science, Research and technology
- Outstanding Doctoral Dissertation Supervisor Award, 2009, Vice president's office for Science and Technology

== Research interests ==
- Approaches to Curriculum Development / Design
- Curriculum Research Methodology
- Art and The Curriculum
- Hidden Curriculum
- Curriculum Integration
- Comparative Studies in Curriculum
- Teaching - Learning Strategies
- Higher Education Curriculum
