= Soltani High School, Shiraz =

Soltani High School
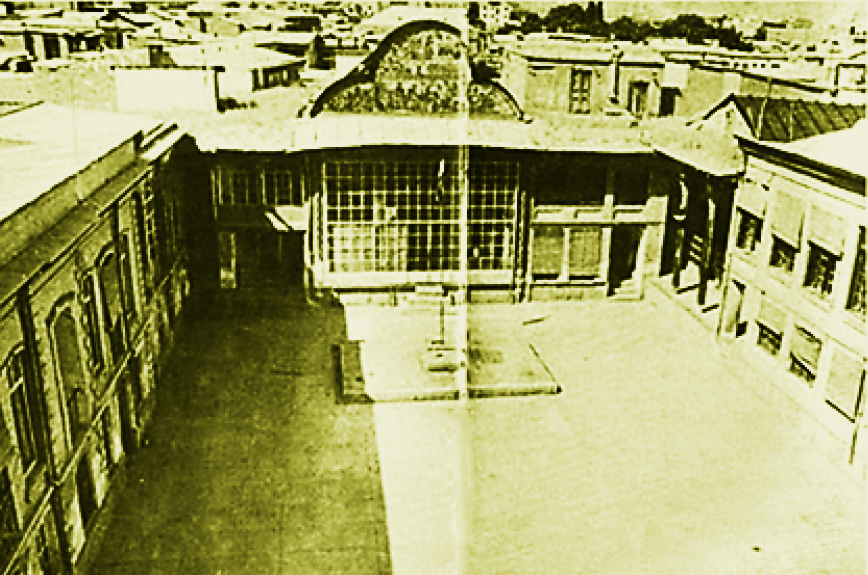
- Old Soltani High School
- Interactive map of Soltani High School
- Location: Shiraz, Fars Province, Iran
- Coordinates: 29°37′09″N 52°31′23″E
- Built: Qajar era
- Owner: Fars Education Department

Soltani High School (In Persian language: دبیرستان سلطانی) is a historical building in Shiraz, Fars Province, Iran, dating back to the Qajar dynasty era. It was originally established and endowed by Sultan Hajieh (a woman). The school is located near the Mosque of Mushir in Shiraz, next to the Mushir Barband.

During the Pahlavi dynasty era, through the efforts of then director Molaei and first deputy Ali Mohammad Kamrani, funding was secured by collecting tuition fees (680 rials total; 80 rials sent for administration, and the remainder for the school’s expenses). Notably, students unable to pay were exempted.

A new property was purchased on Doul Anvar Street, West Mushir, Shiraz, where a large two story building was constructed for grades 7 to 12 according to the old education system of the Pahlavi era. The school offered three majors: Mathematics, Experimental Sciences, and Humanities. The extensive campus included two volleyball courts, one basketball court, a jumping field, gymnastics equipment, a large landscaped garden, and workshops for photography, makeup, electronics, blacksmithing, acting, and more.

After the 1979 Iranian Revolution, without regard to the original founder’s intentions, the school was renamed Molla Sadra High School.

== History ==
In the Shiraz neighborhood of Sang Siah, there is a historic complex known as Mushir, although most tourists only recognize the Mushir Mosque, which is closed outside prayer times.

During the Qajar era, prominent families resided in Shiraz, each assigned by the ruling government to oversee specific districts. One of these was the Mushir family, after whom several streets are still named.

The Mushir family lived in the Sang Siah neighborhood, where Abolhassan Khan Mushir built several structures. The Mushir Mosque is the most famous surviving building from this family.

The complex also included a Hosseinieh (Shia congregation hall). After Abolhassan Khan Mushir’s death, his properties were divided among his children. The Hosseinieh passed to one daughter, Sultan Hajieh, who was married to the son of Mirza Hadi from the Modarres family. Sultan Hajieh endowed her inheritance, and with the support of Karamatollah Mushiri, funded by her endowment, the building's use was changed in 1927 (1306 in the Iranian calendar) to become a high school named Soltani.

== Fate of the Old Building ==
The old building, now almost ruined, is under the care of the Cultural Heritage Organization, responsible for its maintenance and restoration. However, as of 2021, no restoration efforts have been undertaken.

== Fate of the New Building ==
In 2012 (1391 Iranian calendar), the second building of this high school, located on Doul Anvar Street, West Mushir Alley 7, was demolished, and a new building was constructed, with the large courtyard divided.

== See also ==
- Education in Iran
