= Community School, Tehran =

Expatriate boarding school (early 1900s–1979)

Coordinates: 35.694033°N 51.439627°E

- Tehran; Iran

Information
- Type: Boarding school
- Closed: 1979

Teheran American School, TAS

Community School (Persian: مدرسه كامیونیتى) was a boarding school in Tehran, Iran, originally intended for the children of Presbyterian missionaries from the United States who were stationed in Iran since the 1830s. However, it soon served expatriates of all stripes raising children while in Iran. In the late 1940s, the school moved from its original location at Saint Peter Church at Qavām os-Saltaneh Street, to a location at Kucheh Marizkhaneh (Hospital Drive) near Jaleh Street. Following the Iranian Revolution in the summer of 1979, it was permanently shut down by the new government of the Islamic Republic. It was then renamed Modarres Shahed, reserved for the children of the war veterans.

The new campus had been an old Presbyterian missionary hospital during World War II where Iran's last empress, Farah Pahlavi, was born. After the war, it was returned to the missionaries to be used as the school campus and J. Richard Irvine was hired as its headmaster in 1951. The large, tree-filled shady compound had several buildings, a small church, and walking paths.

== History ==
The Presbyterian missionary school established itself in the early 1900s in Hamadan, Western Iran, growing from a "home school" into a formal school. In the 1930s the school moved to Tehran due to logistical considerations, located on Qavām os-Saltaneh Street and had over 200 students. By the 1950s only a few students were children of missionaries as the number of Iranians and foreign students increased. It was commonly called the "American School" because students were taught primarily in English, with French and Persian as secondary languages. Classes met Monday through Thursday and on Saturdays, eventually switching to a permanent Saturday through Wednesday schedule (with Friday as the common holy day). With the exception of some of the Americans, most of the students spoke two or more languages.

The expatriate population of Iran in the early 1900s, during the reign of Ahmad Shah Qajar, was very small and consisted mainly of British people; Iran was in both the British and Russian spheres of influence during the era (the Great Game). Some of the expatriate population included Swedish officers of the early Iranian Gendarmerie, and Russian officers of Persian Cossack Brigade which largely made up the Iranian military. It was from such a Cossack brigade that Reza Shah came to prominence. The American presence in Iran was small at the time and consisted largely of missionaries. The Presbyterian missionaries had a delicate relationship with the Iranian government, which found it easier to appease irritation in the Islamic establishment by restricting Christian religious activities at the school.

== New campus: Khiaban-e Jaleh 1935-1979 ==
After the accession to power of Reza Shah, the influence and presence of Britain and Russia increased in Iran despite the pro-axis leanings of the Shah who refused the Allies' use of the Trans-Iranian Railway. He was deposed and exiled to South Africa in favor of his son in 1941, three months after the launch of the Nazi invasion of the Soviet Union. The American Army's Persian Gulf Command used Iran as a conduit for materiel to the Soviet Union, other routes being far more hazardous. By 1945, 150,000 assembled trucks, jeeps, aircraft, and even fire engines were transhipped from Khorramshahr through Qazvin by truck and Tehran by train and then north to the Soviet Union^{1}. In 1943, the Allies met for the Tehran Conference as a measure of its importance to the Allied war effort. During the war, the Presbyterian missionary hospital, later to become the Community School campus, was taken over for use as a military hospital. After the war, increasing United States involvement with Iran meant more Americans in Iran, and the Community School was the only school in town for their children's education.

In 1953 Headmaster Richard Irvine stated that he was going to limit the number of Americans at Community School. The school did this to preserve a balance in the cultures among the student body. A separate American School of Tehran was established shortly afterward.

President Truman's Point-Four program put a heavy strain on Community School because it brought many more American students. It also brought Iran closer to the US politically, and marked the beginning of a period of economic growth; many Iranians were stimulated to seek a western education for their children.

== Growing pains ==
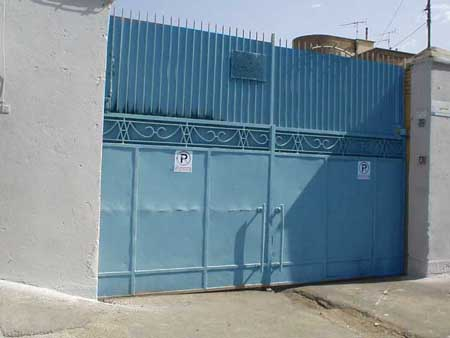
The Blue Gate in 2005

In 1967 there was some tension in the school; the school population was about half Iranian and mostly non-Christian. Although the school atmosphere was open and tolerant, the Presbyterian missionary board thought the school was straying from its charter. By this time Mr. Irvine and board member, Dr. Khodadad Farmanfarmaian had come to the view that the Community should be developed into an International school, and should take on the role of secular college preparatory school. They formed a committee to explore the possibility. The missionary board thought Mr. Irvine and Dr. Farmanfarmaian were leading the school away from its missionary charter, and emotions flared up.

The need for international schools in Iran was strong and was a natural source of conflict and turmoil for the board. At that time, chapel was voluntary, but bible class was required. The missionaries were unhappy: The school had largely become a school for upper-class Iranian children. The missionary board reacted negatively to the committee promoting an International school. Over the summer of 1967, Community School headmaster Richard Irvine and Dr. Farman-Farmanian left to found the Iranzamin School, with Irvine its new headmaster. This parting of ways caused many hurt feelings, and many of the people involved bore strong grudges lasting years. Ms. Sahakian, a school icon, went to Iranzamin School; Ms. Amin, another school icon, stayed at Community School.

After the departure of Mr. Irvine, the missionary board hired Douglas Hill as the next headmaster. Given the problems of running a religious school in Iran, including government objections and interference, Mr. Hill also moved the school in the direction of a secular international school.

== School spirit ==
I pledge allegiance to my country, and to the United Nations of which it is a part, one world brotherhood of peaceful nations, with liberty and justice for all.

—The United Nations Pledge

Someone once called the Community School "a laboratory of democracy at work." Besides the Americans, there were students from prominent Iranian families and children from Europe, Asia, and the Middle East, whose families were living temporarily in Tehran. Their parents were diplomats, exiles, military, professionals, oil industry personnel, etc. CHS represented 28 nationalities and eight religions. Christians, Jews, Moslems, and Zoroastrians blended without a problem. Above the school entrance, in Persian calligraphy, were the words from the Book of John, 8:32, "You shall know the truth, and the truth shall make you free." Some students learned the United Nations pledge of allegiance to the individual countries and flags and sang the United Nations hymn, the "Song of Peace," set to music by the Finnish composer, Jean Sibelius.

The school facilities on the new campus were a big improvement, but there was a downside. It was located at the end of a dead-end street in a dangerous part of the city where unrest and riots were particularly common during the late 1970s. The class of 1979 was the last and final class to hold a graduation ceremony on the main campus in June of that year, after which its doors were closed forever.

== Notable alumni ==
- Asif Ahmad CMG - British High Commissioner to Jamaica and the Bahamas, formerly as British Ambassador to the Republic of the Philippines.
- Bob Barr (Class of 1966) - Member of the United States House of Representatives from Georgia from 1995 to 2003
- Ari Ben-Menashe - Diplomat for the United Kingdom
- Peter G. Levine - Medical researcher on strokes.
- Valentine Moghadam - Professor of Sociology and International Affairs, Northeastern University.
- Yasmine Pahlavi - Wife of Prince Reza Pahlavi
- Scott E. Parazynski - NASA astronaut
- Darius Rejali - Chair of Political Science Department at Reed College
- Norman Schwarzkopf, Jr. (1950–51) - U.S. retired General; was Allied Commander during the 1990-1991 Gulf War. Schwarzkopf's father was brought in during the early years of the Truman Point-Four program to organize the Iranian Gendarmerie (police).
