= Tehran American School =

Defunct international school in Tehran, Iran

Information
- Established: 1954
- Closed: 31 December 1978; 47 years ago
- Grades: K-12
- Language: English

The Tehran American School (TAS) was an American international school in Tehran, Iran. It was founded in 1954, and it held its final classes in 1978. The school, affiliated with the U.S. Embassy in Tehran, served grades K–12 in a coeducational manner and used English as the language of instruction.

== History ==
The American school was established after the director of the Community School, Tehran, Richard Irvine, announced in 1953 that the school was going to limit the number of Americans enrolled to preserve a balance in the cultures among the student body. The U.S. Ambassador to Iran, Loy Henderson, guided the opening of the new American school, which initially had Kindergarten through grade 8, the following year. The school initially had 94 students.

The senior high school division opened by 1960. In May 1973 the school had 1,400 students. The school's first campus, which opened in 1954, was later named the Sayed Khandan Campus in 1974. A new elementary and middle school campus, Lavizan Campus, opened in the fall of that year. In the fall of 1976, an athletic center and gymnasium opened. As of 1976, the school planned to open a new high school campus.

At its peak, TAS was the largest American school outside the United States with about 2,000 students. The school closed due to disruptions that developed into the Iranian Revolution. The last superintendent, i.e., principal of the entire school, Dr. William Keough, was seized in the Iran hostage crisis in 1979 in the course of shipping out the students' transcripts; the transcripts were never sent. The TAS campus subsequently became an Iranian university, Shahid Rajaee Teacher Training University (SRTTU). The main mission of the Shahid Rajaee Teacher Training University is educating the teachers for technical and vocational education schools in Iran.

Today the grounds have been rebuilt for the restricted use of the National Archives and Library of Iran ( Sazman Asnad va Ketabkhaneh Melli), and the public use Tehran Book garden (Baghe Ketab Tehran), a multi-plex arts, culture, and science education center.

== Library ==
The school library had 18,000 volumes. John F. Harvey, a visiting professor at Motahedin University in Vanak, Iran, stated that the American school had "[p]robably the best school library" in Iran. According to Harvey, the American School's library was the first modern school library in Iran.

== Student body ==
Frontline has reported that historically most students did not have many Iranian friends and "led lives fairly isolated from Iranian society". At the same time, they developed emotional connections to the host country.

== See also ==
- Iran–United States relations
- United States Ambassador to Iran
