= Iran Language Institute =

Persian government organization

The Iran Language Institute, abbreviated as ILI (Persian: کانون زبان ایران) is a state-owned, non-profit organization founded in 1979 in Iran with the national mission of developing foreign language learning. It is a subsidiary of Institute for the Intellectual Development. The headquarters of this institute is located in the country's capital, Tehran. The ILI, in 2012 having around 200 centers in 73 cities, offers language courses in Persian, English, French, German, Russian, Spanish, Chinese, and Arabic to around 175,000 learners.

== Before 1979 ==
The Iran Language Institute, previously referred to as Iran–America Society, was established in 1925 in Tehran. In the past, Iran America Society provided various educational services including teaching English to business people and employees in both public and private sectors, and also teaching Persian to foreigners.

After the Islamic Revolution, this society affiliated with the Institute for the Intellectual Development of Children and Young Adults and, therefore, expanded its services.

== Levels to go before TOEFL (English) ==
1. Basic (in 3 books)
2. Elementary (in 3 books)
3. Pre Intermediate (in 3 books)
4. Intermediate (in 3 books)
5. High Intermediate (in 3 books)+ A Mini Dictionary
6. Advanced (in 3 books) + A Mini Dictionary

Advancedes term is for exams tofel

and ielts and Jce and sce and pte.

== Arabic Levels ==
1. Basic / Arabic: الأساسية (in 1 book)
2. Elementary / Arabic: التمهيدية (in 4 books)
3. Intermediate /Arabic: المتوسطة (in 4 books)
4. Advanced / Arabic: العالية (in 4 books)

== French ==
The French department of the ILI was established in 1981, considering the long historical relationship between Iran and France that made French the second official language of Iran until 1950's, that resulted to inclusion of French loanwords in Iranian Persian. At the beginning, there were only 5 levels of general and audio visual classes, but now there are 20 levels ranging from the beginning to advanced classes held in Tehran and some other cities including Mashhad, Esfahan, Tabriz, Shiraz, and Karaj.

Level	Symbol
_{Niveau Élémentaire Primaire} _{First Elementary Levels}	NEP_{1} - NEP_{2}- NEP_{3}- NEP_{4}
_{Niveau Élémentaire Secondaire} _{Second Elementary Levels}	NES_{1} - NES_{2}- NES_{3} - NES_{4}
_{Niveau Intermédiaire Primaire} _{First Intermediate Levels}	NIP_{1} - NIP_{2} - NIP_{3}
_{Niveau Intermédiaire Secondaire} _{Second Intermediate Levels}	NIS_{1} - NIS_{2} - NIS_{3}

== German ==
The German department of the ILI, established in 1993 in cooperation with Carl Duisburg Center, has always tried to use modern teaching methods. There are nine levels based on Schritte series, and five complementary levels based on Aspekte method.

GA1 GA2 GA3	A1/2
GA4 GA5 GA6	A2/2
GA7 GA8 GA9	B1/2
MA1 MA2	B1+
MA3 MA4 MA5	B2/2

== Spanish ==
The international examination of Spanish (DELE) is simultaneously administered in 86 countries by Servantes Institute every year. The exam is administered in three levels (Básico, Intermedio, Superiory) in Iran by the embassy of Spain. Considering the growing political, cultural, and business relations between Iran and the Spanish-speaking countries, the ILI has established the Spanish language department using methods and textbooks approved by Instituto Cervantes in Madrid.

Spanish Courses for Adults are in Elementary, Intermediate, Advanced, and Upper Advanced levels.

Comienza	Continúa	Avanza	Perfecciona
ELE.1 ELE.2 ELE.3	ELE.4 ELE.5 ELE.6	ELE.7 ELE.8 ELE.9	ELE.10 ELE.11 ELE.12

== See also ==
- Education in Iran
- Institute for the Intellectual Development of Children and Young Adults
- Iran–America Society
