= Social class in Iran =

Social classes in Iran.
1. Upper class (4.30%)
2. Upper middle-class (19.0%)
3. Lower middle-class (15.0%)
4. Working class (45.0%)
5. Lower class (16.7%)

Social classes in Iran have been divided up into upper class, upper middle class, lower middle class, working class, independent farmers, and rural wage earners. A more recent source divides Iranian classes into upper, middle class (about 32% of the population in 2000), working class (about 45% of the labor force), and lower class. Former Iranian President Mahmoud Ahmadinejad says 60 percent of his country's wealth is controlled by just 300 people in Iran. The gini coefficient was 0.38 in 2010 and the Human Development Index at 0.749 in 2013.

One of the main objectives of the Iranian Revolution was to have no social classes. In the post-revolutionary era, access to political power, an important basis for measuring influence and elite status in pre-revolutionary Iran, has continued to be important for ascribing status, even though the composition of the political elite has changed. For a decade after 1979, gaining entry to the political elite at the national or provincial level depended on having revolutionary credentials. These credentials depended on being able to provide evidence of having participated in the demonstrations and other revolutionary activities during 1978–79, and having a reputation for being a good Muslim. The necessary Muslim reputation was acquired by attending public prayers and observing Islamic codes of conduct in one's private life. Revolutionary credentials became less significant for the generation that matured after the early 1990s. Education, especially a college degree, became an informal substitute for revolutionary credentials.

== Upper class ==
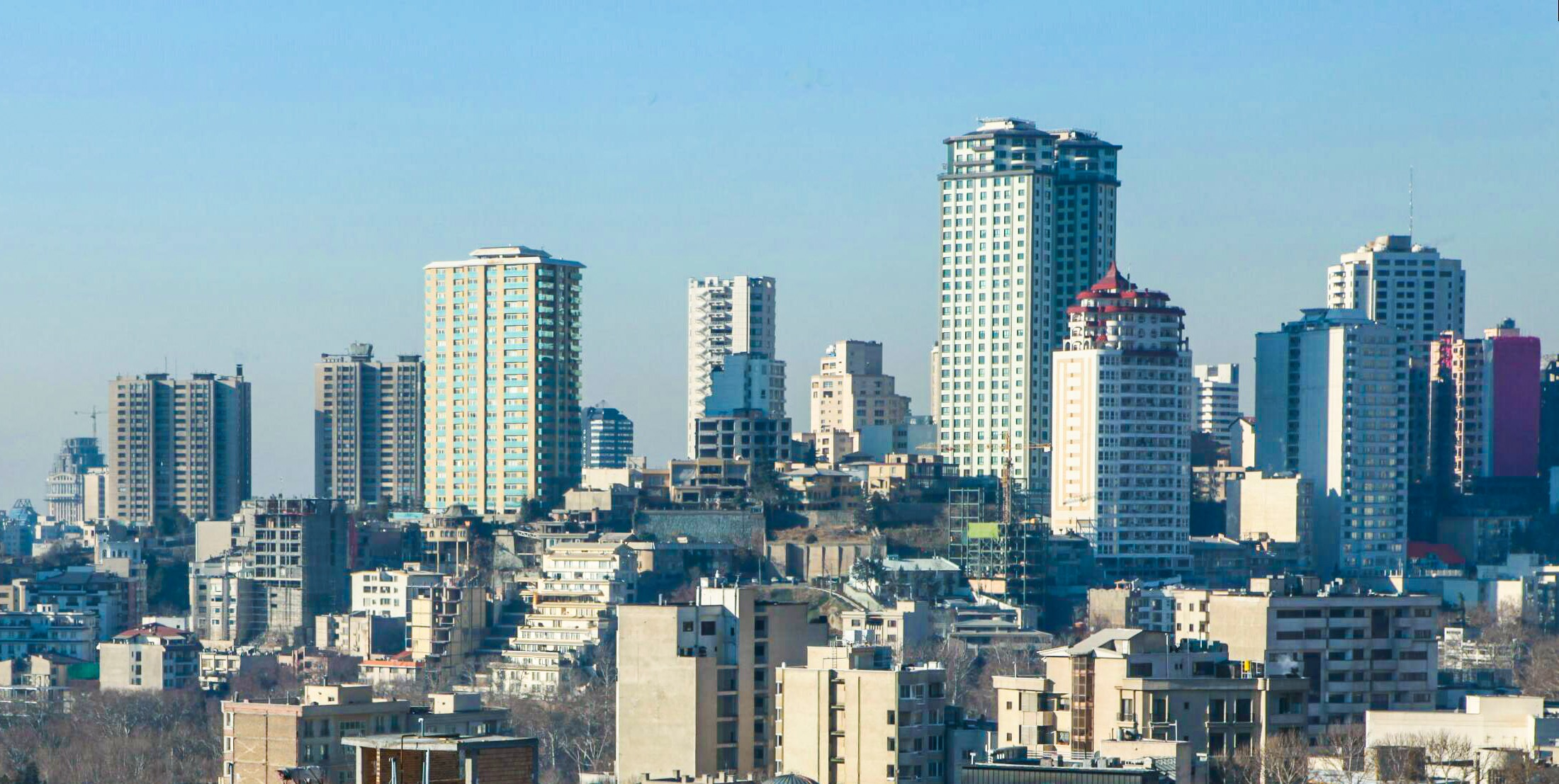
Tehran's district 1 skyline, home to Iranian millionaires.

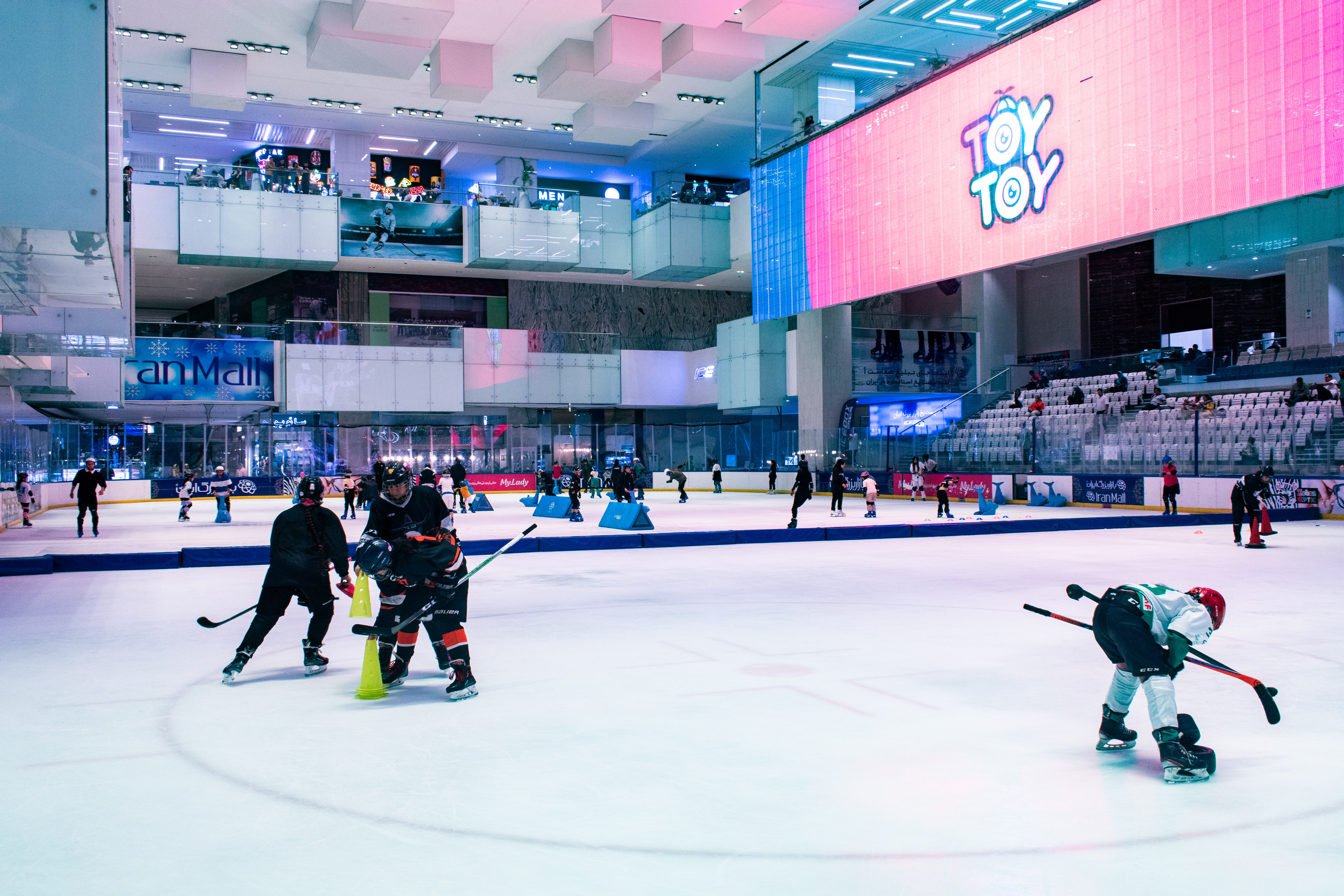
Iran Mall's ice hockey rink. The mall was developed by Ayandeh Bank connected to Mojataba Khamenei.

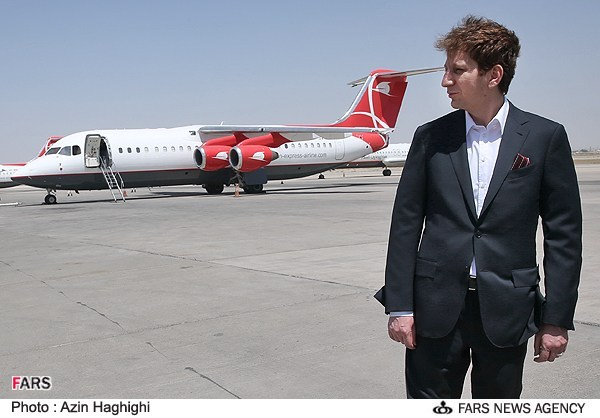
Babak Zanjani, a well-known Iranian CEO.

In Iranian society, the top ten percent earners pay 3% of all income taxes, while in the United States the top 10% pay more than 70% of the total income taxes (US billionaires are collectively richer than their Iranian counterparts, however). The postrevolutionary upper class consisted of some of the same social groups as the old elite, such as large landowners, industrialists, financiers, and large-scale merchants. A sizable amount of this demographic, especially those of non-Shia backgrounds, have migrated out of Iran to places like the United States and had their assets confiscated by the state. A minority of the pre-revolutionary upper class, especially those who were more religious or sympathetic with the revolution, continue to work and live within Iran. For the most part, however, such persons did not occupy positions of political influence pre-revolution. As of 2025, Iran’s upper class—roughly the top 5% or 4 million people—consists of those with a net worth above 60 billion tomans (≈$750k USD), but true elites often control $2M+ in shared assets, placing them among Iran’s high-net-worth individuals and next to ~246,000 multimillionaires (2023). Despite being the 17th most populous country in the world, the UBS ranked Iran 14th in the world in terms of the number of millionaires. Due to the lack of readily-available mortgages or lines of credit (akin to those in developed countries) many Iranians grow up with an entrepreneurial spirit, this is exacerbated by the historical roots of most of the Iranian bourgeoisie (urban-dwellers) in the Bazaar. These individuals typically derive wealth from Iran's biggest industries (oil, manufacturing, banks), monopolized imports, or control of bonyads, which manage up to 20% of Iran’s GDP. Many are also part of old merchant families with connected networks for medium-to-large scale manufacturing often defined as having 30+ full-time workers. Manufacturing is huge in Iran and its beneficiaries make a fortune from Iranian brands (packaged food, clothing, etc.). Medium-to-large-scale Manufacturures profit upwards of several hundred thousand USD. Owning shops in Tehran's Grand Bazaar is a status symbol in Iran as prices go up to $50 thousand USD per square meter. A 20 square meter shop sells for $1M USD in the Bazaar.

Additionally, in recent years, especially during the JCPOA, Tehran has seen a booming finance sector with the Tehran Stock Exchange going green, start-ups propping up, and many banks entering investment banking.

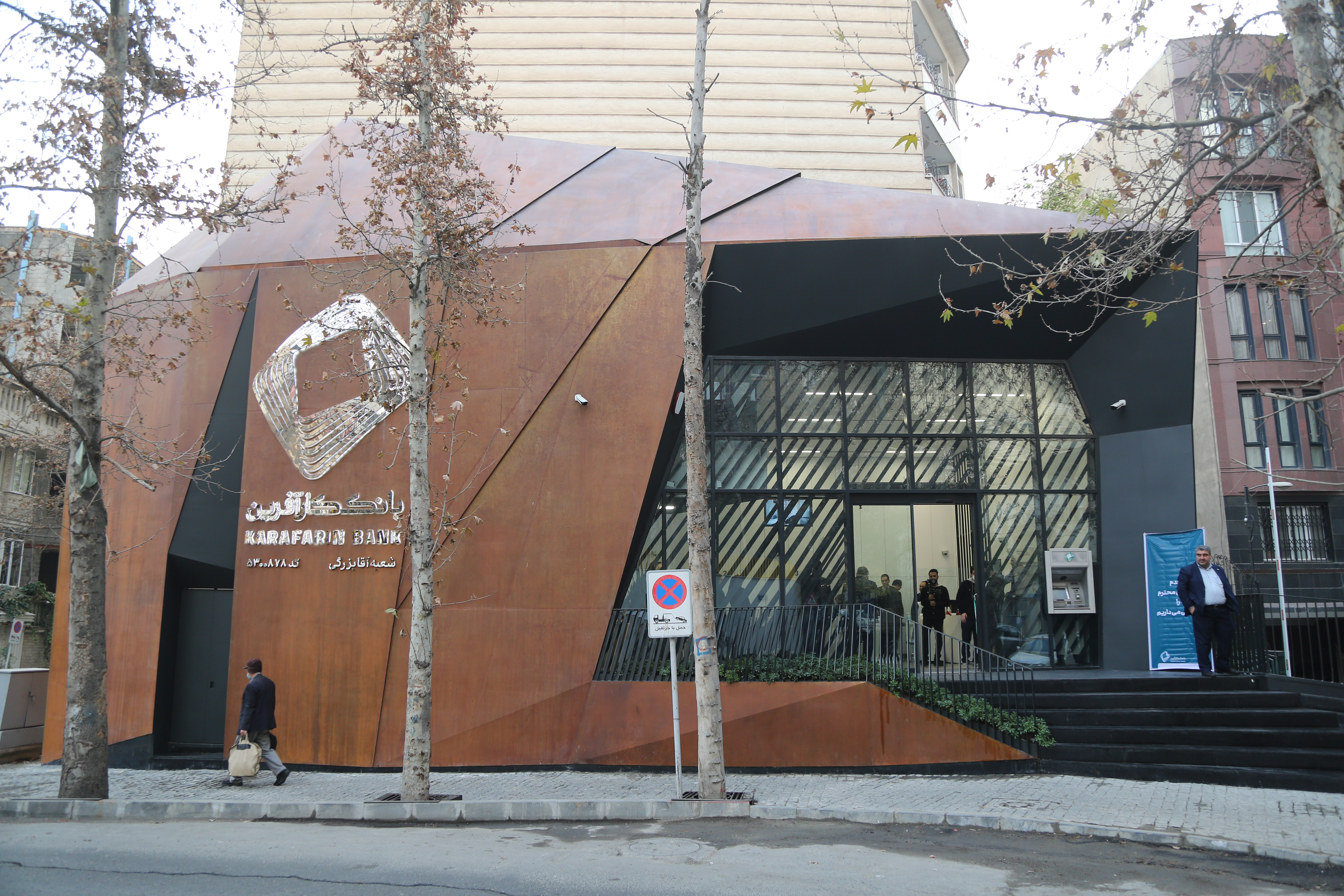
Karafarin Bank (Entrepreneur Bank) in Fereshteh, Tehran.

A villa in Northern Iran, a popular vacation property spot for wealthy Iranians.

In contrast, Iran’s upper middle class includes salaried professionals like specialist physicians, engineers, lawyers, professors, and retail owners with monthly incomes of 80–400 million Tomans ($1,000–$5,000 USD). They enjoy relative comfort—owning apartments, cars, and affording some travel—but have far less access to inherited capital, overseas assets, or systemic privilege. The gap between the two groups is wide: the upper class is shielded from inflation and sanctions by offshore holdings and state contracts, while the upper middle class remains vulnerable to economic shocks and currency devaluation. In recent years, after experiencing huge economic losses in the hyper-inflationary period of 2018-2020, this group has experienced a massive shift to immigration especially to countries like Turkey, Sweden, Germany, and Canada. Because of these losses- politically and socially this group tends to be more Liberal. They often organize anti-government rallies outside of the country.

Those with political influence comprise senior clergy, high-ranking bureaucrats, executive officers of public and private corporations and charitable foundations, and wealthy entrepreneurs; small number of which had been part of the pre-revolutionary economic and social elite. Although a reputation for piety and loyalty to the ideals of the Revolution initially was a more important attribute than family or wealth for participation in the post-revolutionary political elite, those who attained politically powerful positions received generous salaries that elevated them to the top income brackets and opened access to multiple legitimate opportunities for acquiring more wealth. The children of the new elite generally have been encouraged to get college educations, and postgraduate degrees from foreign universities have become status symbols since the mid-1990s. These social trends have gradually but informally altered the criteria for recruitment into the political elite: Possessing a university degree and having ties to a prominent religious or revolutionary family have become advantageous in the competition for politically influential positions.

In terms of lifestyle, the Iranian upper class enjoys owning properties in districts with more privacy. These areas frequently have less police since they are less busy than the central areas of the city. Though, a sizable portion of the Iranian upper class come from religious or politically-connected families, their children are often found flaunting a free and Western lifestyle online. This phenomenon led to Instagram pages like the Rich Kids of Tehran propping up back in the 2010s. After the 2022 protests, an expansion of Western culture particularly in wealthy areas has risen especially in bigger cities like Isfahan, and Shiraz.

Then-Iranian President Mahmoud Ahmadinejad says 60 percent of his country's wealth is controlled by 300 people in Iran (out of a population of 80 million in 2016). Rich Iranians, companies, and state-backed buyers will spend up to $8.5 billion on overseas real estate over the next five-to-10 years (2016).

Politically, the Iranian upper class is closer to Iranian principlists, while the middle class (including the upper middle class) is closer to the Iranian reformists. The principlists advocate for crony capitalism, and rent-seeking behaviour. This is especially true for power holders in the Chamber of Commerce (ICCIMA). Big business, and even medium-to-large entrepreneurs in Iran are connected to the Chamber and receive benefits like sanction evasion, exclusive rights to import or export, and "Government currency-rates". This leads to a massive competitive advantage in the market leading to very desirable profit margins. The new Iranian leader, Mojtaba Khamenei, is very well-connected to these circles.

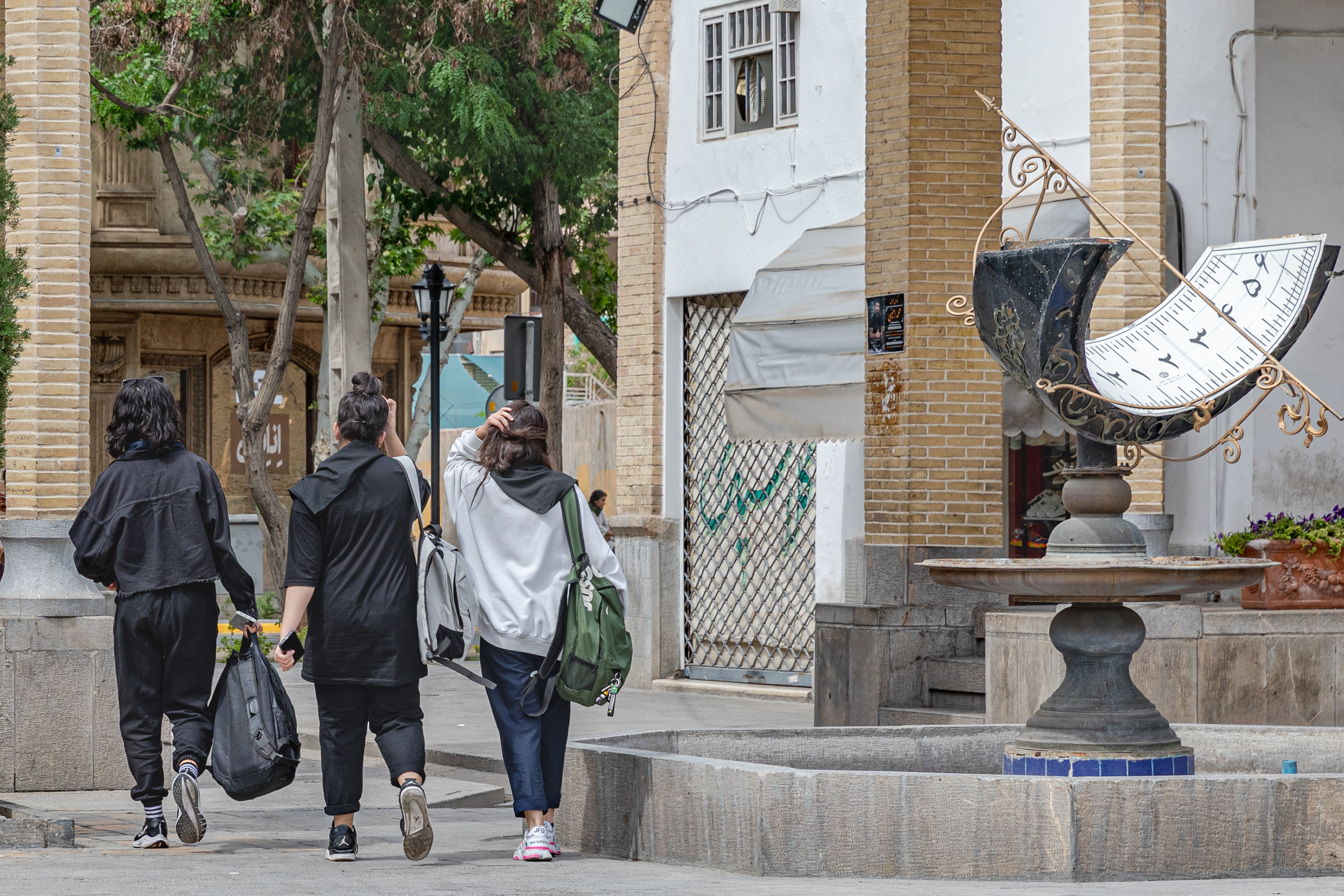
Upscale Armenian-esque district in Isfahan, known for relaxed hijab laws second to Northern Tehran.

Hassan Rouhani hoped to modernize Iran's economy by getting sanctions lifted and removing government subsidies. When Trump pulled out of the Iranian nuclear deal, and the subsidized price of gas raised anyways many lower class Iranians were angry hence the 2019 protests.

Despite amassing good wealth, Iranian entrepreneurs still have a hard time doing international business and scaling up across the region. This issue along with loosening hijab laws gave rise to some upper class Iranians, especially those from Azerbaijani Iran, rooting for the Pezeshkian government. This would also explain why he was ratified for office, as the regime still welcomes some lifting of sanctions. Pezeshkian also supports making the education system more fair by improving public schools, hence he also has a base with the lower class.

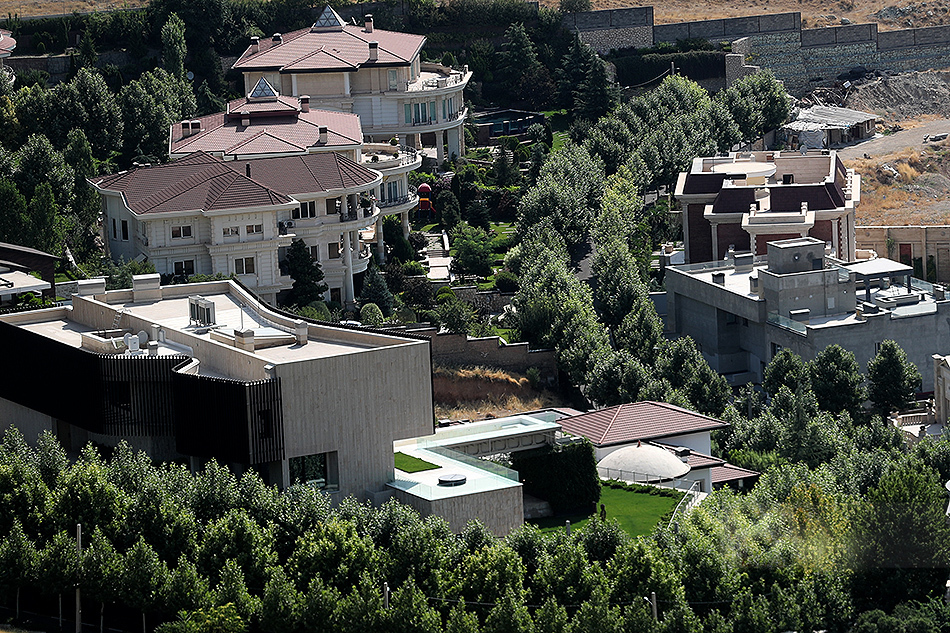
Basti Hills in Lavasan, a weekend get-away for the Rich Kids of Tehran.

The Nouveau riche, far from the bazaar includes: Instagram influencers, YouTubers, investment bankers, and crypto traders. Iranian actor/actresses, footballers, and TV hosts are also part of the Iranian upper class who mostly reside in Northern Tehran.

== Middle class ==
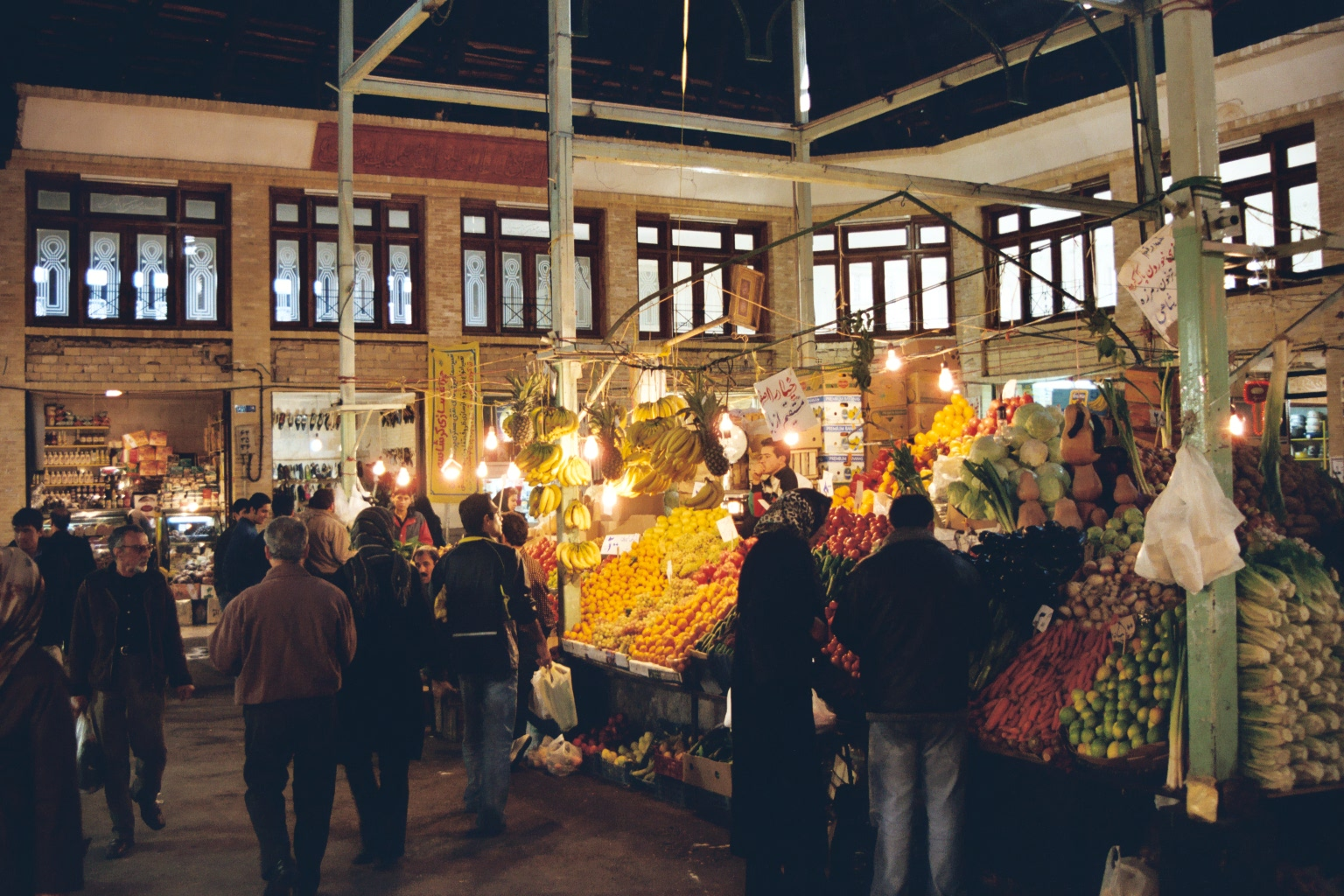
Tajrish Bazaar in Tehran. After the Revolution, the composition of the middle class in Iran did not change significantly, but its size doubled from about 15 percent of the population in 1979 to more than 32 percent in 2000.

After the revolution, the composition of the middle class remained largely the same, but its size grew significantly—rising from about 15 percent of the population in 1979 to over 32 percent by 2000. A major factor behind this expansion was unprecedented access to education. Prior to the revolution, universities were primarily located in major cities, and much of Iran’s educated middle class was brought in from the West to fill workforce gaps. While cities like Tehran and Esfahan did have established universities with a fair amount of local enrollment, these students were often cosmopolitan leftists who opposed the Shah and ultimately supported the 1979 revolution.

The cultural divide between Iran’s secular and religious middle class did not disappear after the revolution; however, the political dynamics between the two groups shifted dramatically. Before 1979, the secular middle class had more influence, and the state sought to limit religion to the private sphere. After the revolution, however, the Islamic Republic promoted religion as a central part of public life. This shift has had a significant impact on the economic divide: while religious Iranians, especially those in the bazaar, security forces, and government, became more politically and economically powerful, the secular middle class found itself marginalized, with many of its members experiencing economic decline. This reversal of fortunes has been a source of tension, as secular individuals often resent the religious dominance in political and social life, particularly in laws they feel encroach on their personal freedoms.

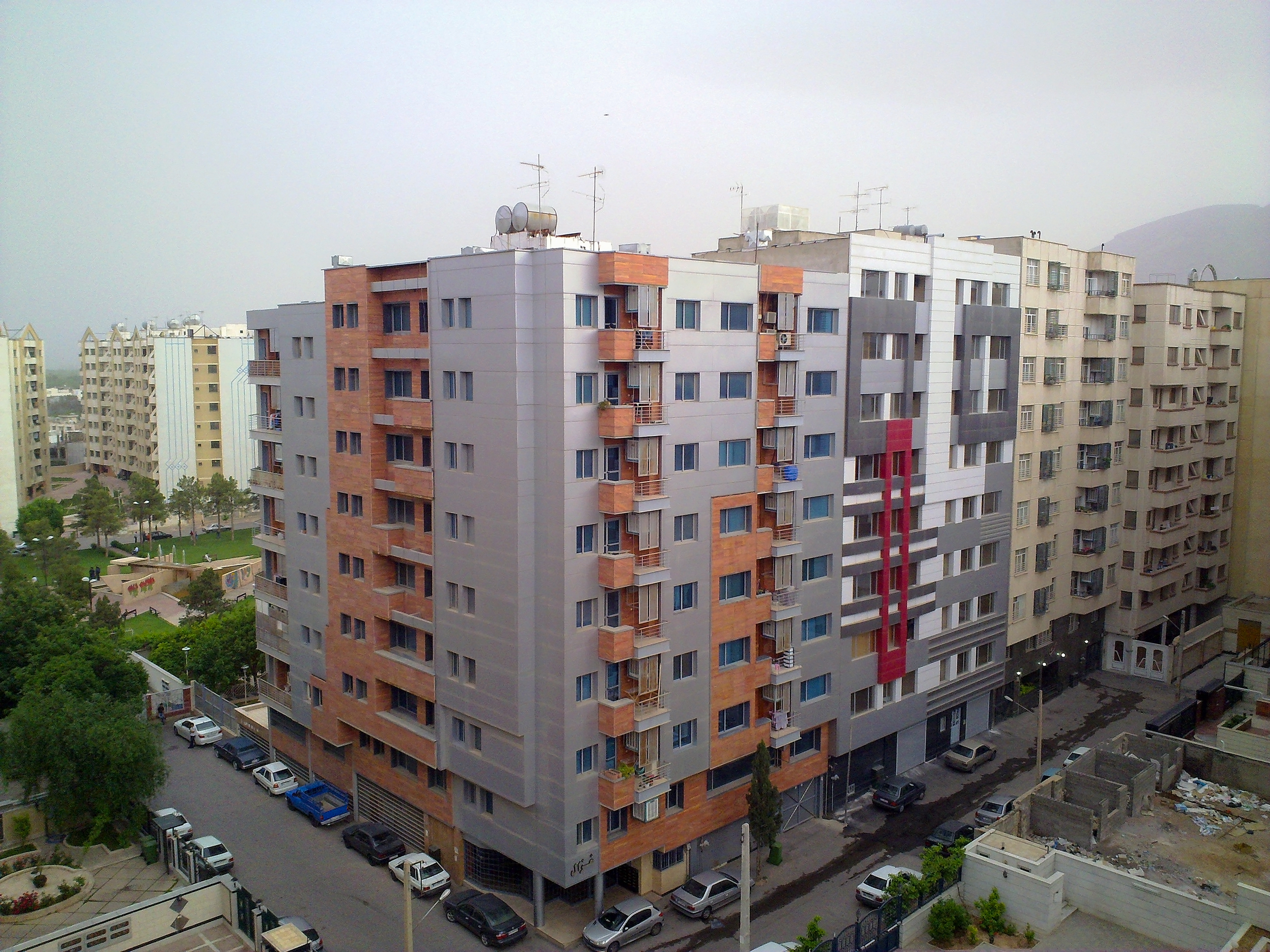
Typical middle class apartments in Iran.

Several prerevolutionary social groups still were identifiable, including bazaar salesman, physicians, engineers, university teachers, managers of private and public concerns, civil servants, teachers, medium-scale landowners, junior military officers, and the middle ranks of the Shia clergy. New groups also emerged, including technicians in specialized fields such as communications, computers, electronics, and medical services; owners of small-scale factories employing fewer than 30 workers; owners of construction firms and transport companies; and professional staff of broadcast and print media. Merchants, especially those with ties to bazaar-based organizations even though their stores were physically located outside the traditional covered bazaars, gained access to political power that they had lacked before the Revolution.

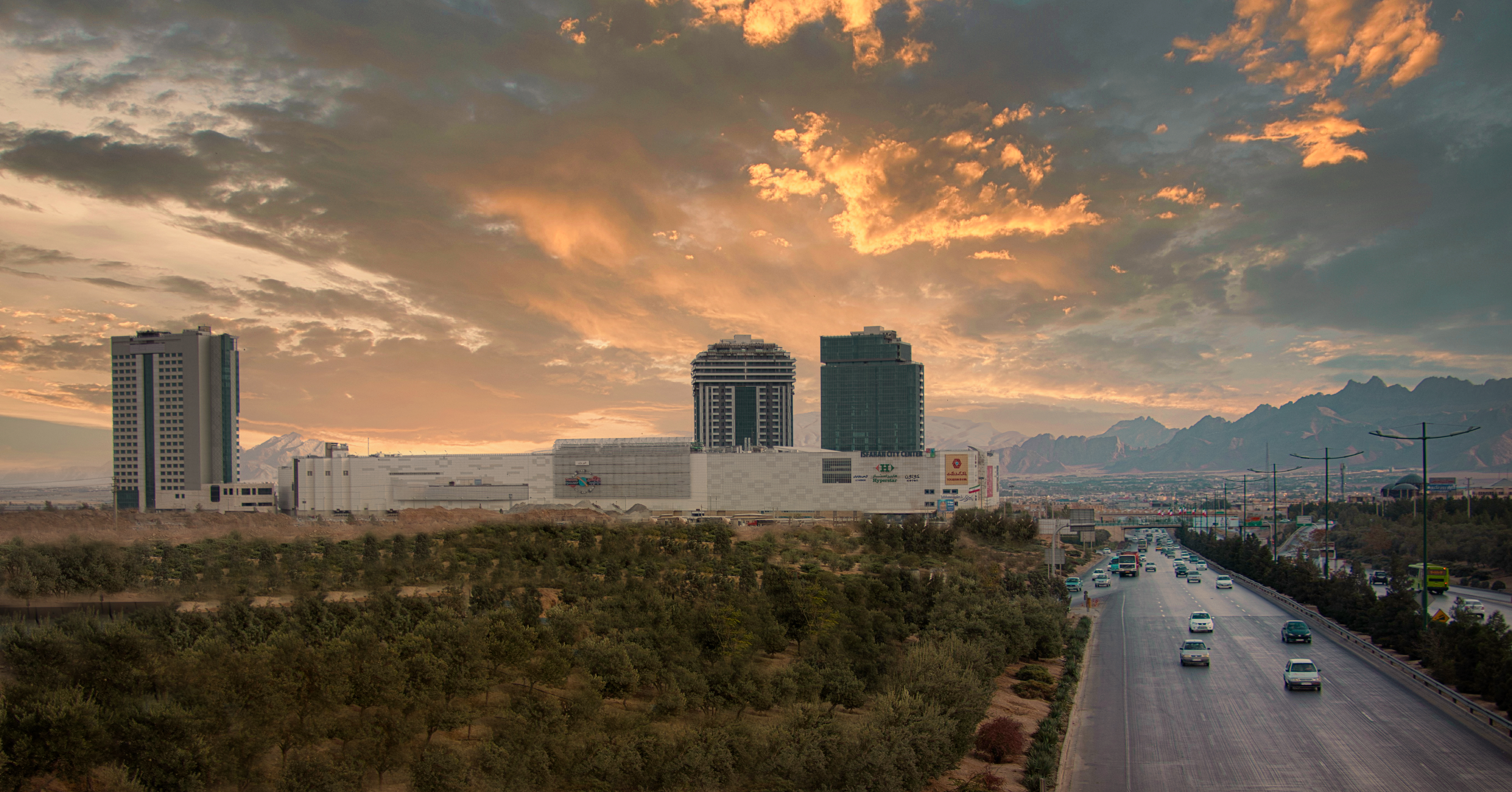
Isfahan's largest shopping mall and hypermarket located in South Isfahan, home to many of the city's professionals.

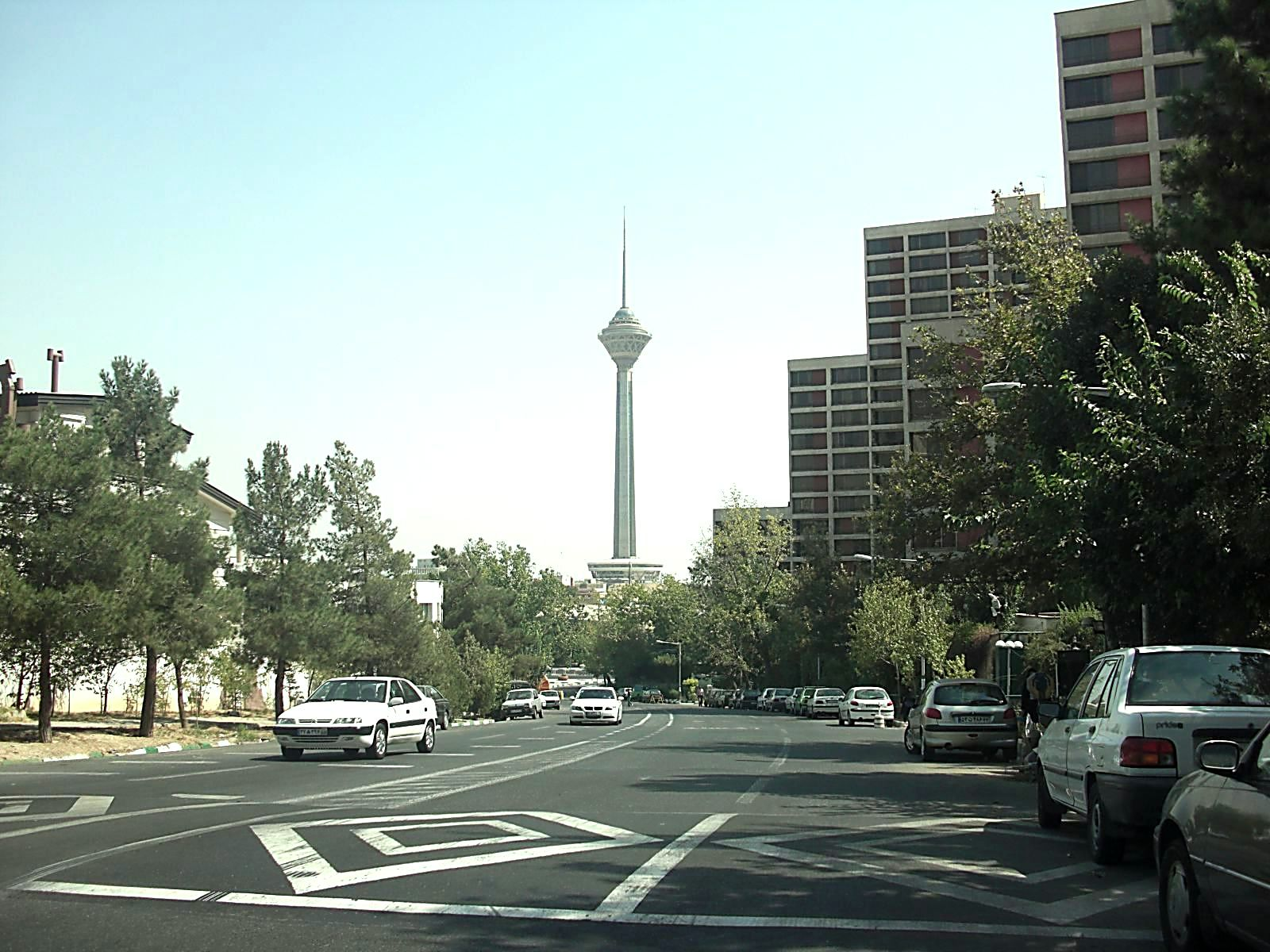
Tehran's second district, home to many middle class families.

In 2024, for subsidy purposes, Iranians were placed into 10 different brackets in terms of income and assets. The 10th bracket including Iran's top 10 percent was defined as having a reported monthly income of $650+ USD (35M toman at the time). This number is low because a sizable portion of the top 10 percent don't report salaried income. Hence, other conditions such as owning a house (assets) valued more than 550k USD, having dual residency, or owning a car valued higher than 50k USD were also conditions that barred this bracket from getting monthly subsidy payments from the government. The former half of this bracket, along with members of the 9th, 8th, and 7th bracket can be thought of being in the upper, and lower middle class respectively. The lower middle class, i.e. the 7th bracket were reported to have a monthly salary of 350-450 USD.

== Working class ==
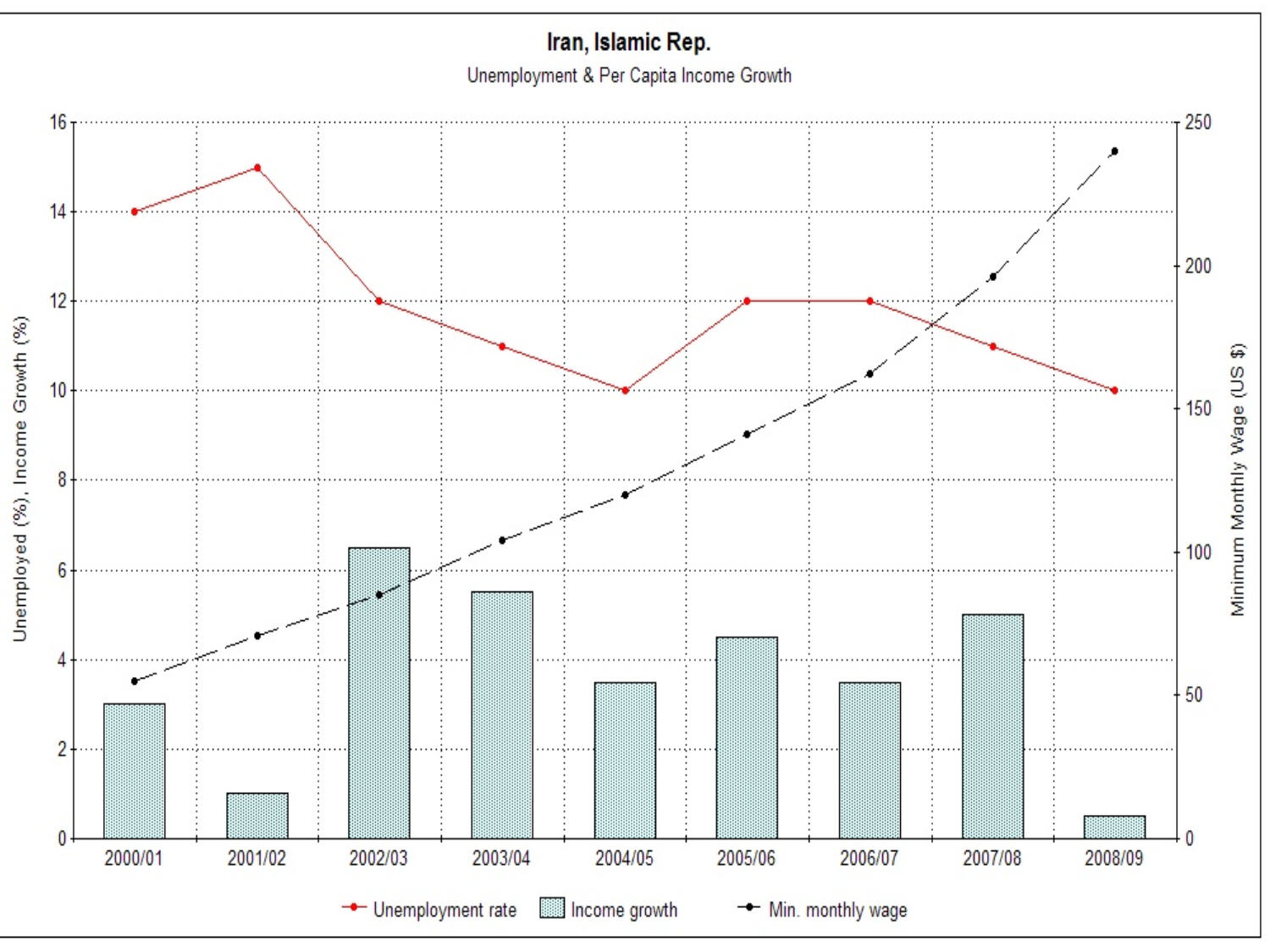
Unemployment rate, per-capita income growth and minimum wage (2000–2009).

An urban industrial working class separate from the traditional artisan class of the towns has been in the process of formation since the early twentieth century. The industrialization programs of the Pahlavi shahs provided the impetus for the expansion of this class. By the early 1970s, a distinct working-class identity, 'kargaar', had emerged, although those who applied this term to themselves did not constitute a unified group. Rather, the working class was segmented by economic sectors: the oil industry, manufacturing, construction, and transportation; also, many members of the working class were employed as mechanics. The largest component, factory workers, numbered about 2.5 million on the eve of the Revolution, double the number in 1965, accounting for 25 percent of Iran's total labor force.

Since 1979, the urban working class has continued to expand; by the early 2000s, it constituted more than 45 percent of the employed labor force. As was the situation before the Revolution, however, the workers within any one occupation did not share a common identity but rather were divided according to their perceived skills. For example, skilled construction workers, such as carpenters, electricians, and plumbers, earned significantly higher wages than the more numerous unskilled workers and tended to look down on them. Similar status differences were common among workers in the oil industry and manufacturing. An estimated 7 percent of all workers were Afghan refugees in the early 2000s. These workers were concentrated in unskilled jobs, especially in construction. Because most Afghan workers did not have work permits after 1992 and thus worked illegally, employers could pay them less than the daily minimum wage rates and not provide them with benefits required for Iranian workers.

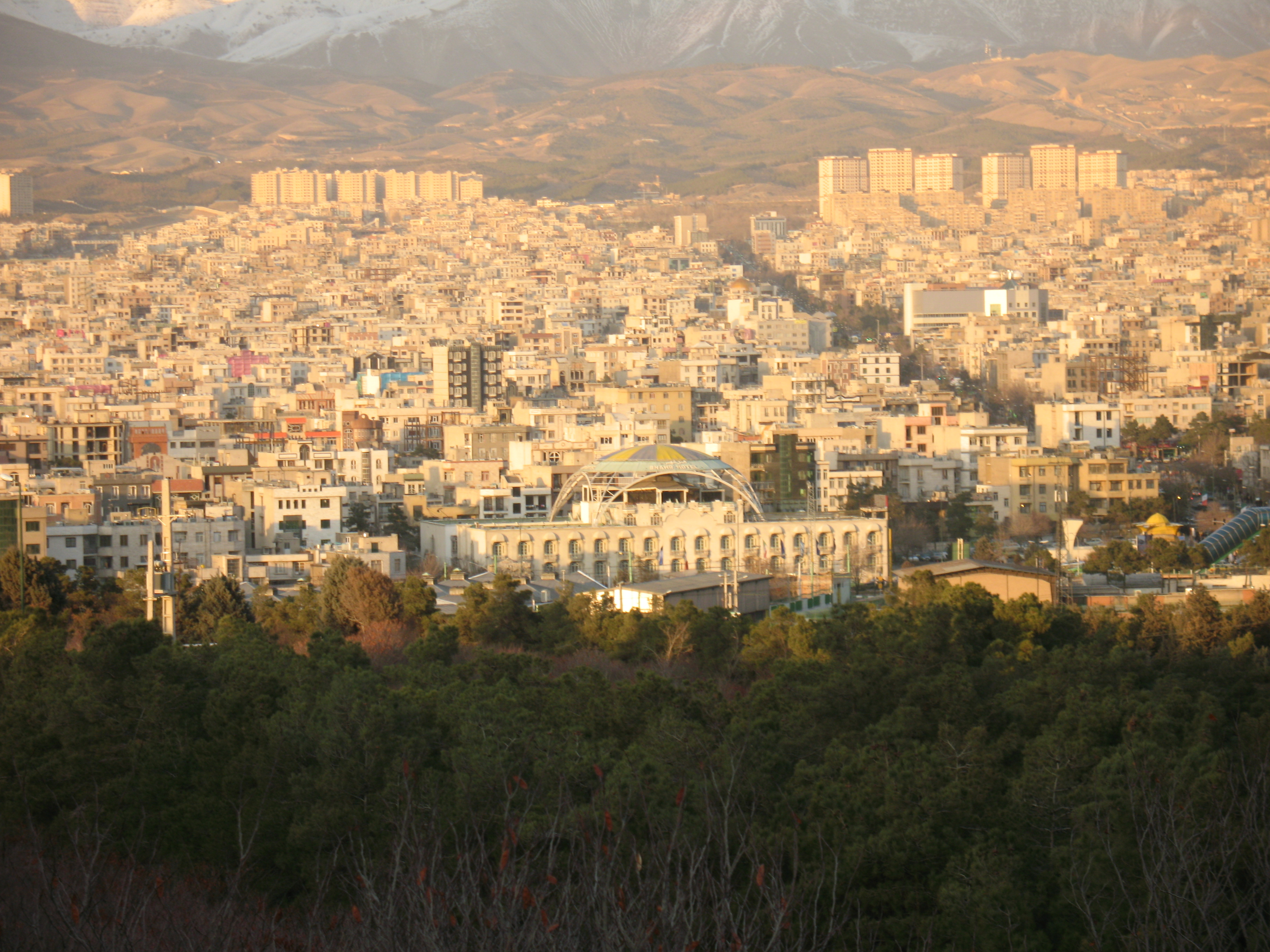
A lower-tier district in Tehran, home to working-class Iranians.

Under both the monarchy and the republic, the government has strictly controlled union activity. After the Revolution, the Ministry of Labor established the Workers' House to sponsor Islamic unions in large manufacturing concerns. These unions discourage strikes through a combination of cooptation of workers through periodic raises and bonuses and cooperation with authorities to identify and discipline workers who exhibit tendencies toward independence. The Islamic unions generally have been effective in preventing major strikes by workers; a long history of factionalism among different working-class occupational groups and between skilled and unskilled workers within individual industries has contributed to this relative success. Nevertheless, since the early 1990s scattered strikes have defied union control. In some instances, the strikes have been resolved peacefully through negotiations, while in other cases they have been repressed violently by security forces.

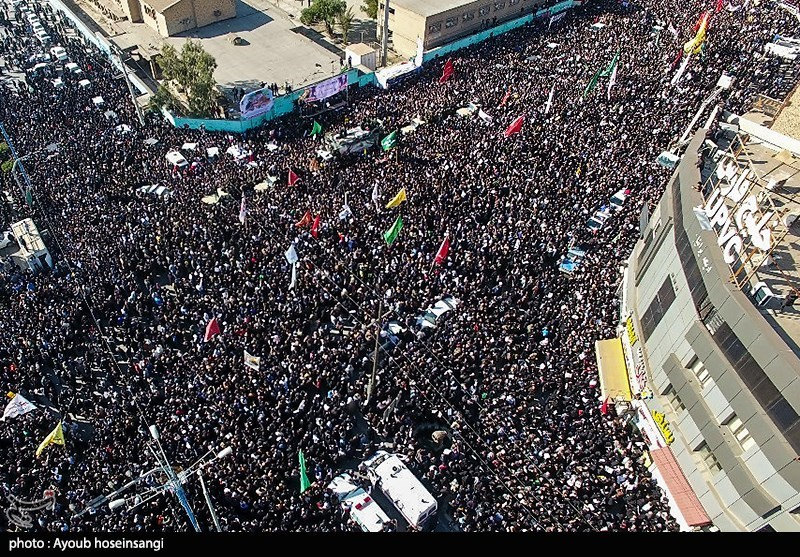
The Islamic Republic maintains a stronghold over this class through the distribution of subsidies and educational privileges granted to the children of martyrs and war-injured veterans.

As of 2025, the working class can expect to make around 150-200 USD monthly from a 40h/week job or up to 250 USD (20M Toman) from different jobs or with overtime. Many members of this class come from smaller cities or more rural areas commonly referred to as "dehaat". Many sell their belongings in their towns and move to the outskirts of Tehran, Isfahan, or Shiraz for education or for better pay.

== Lower class ==
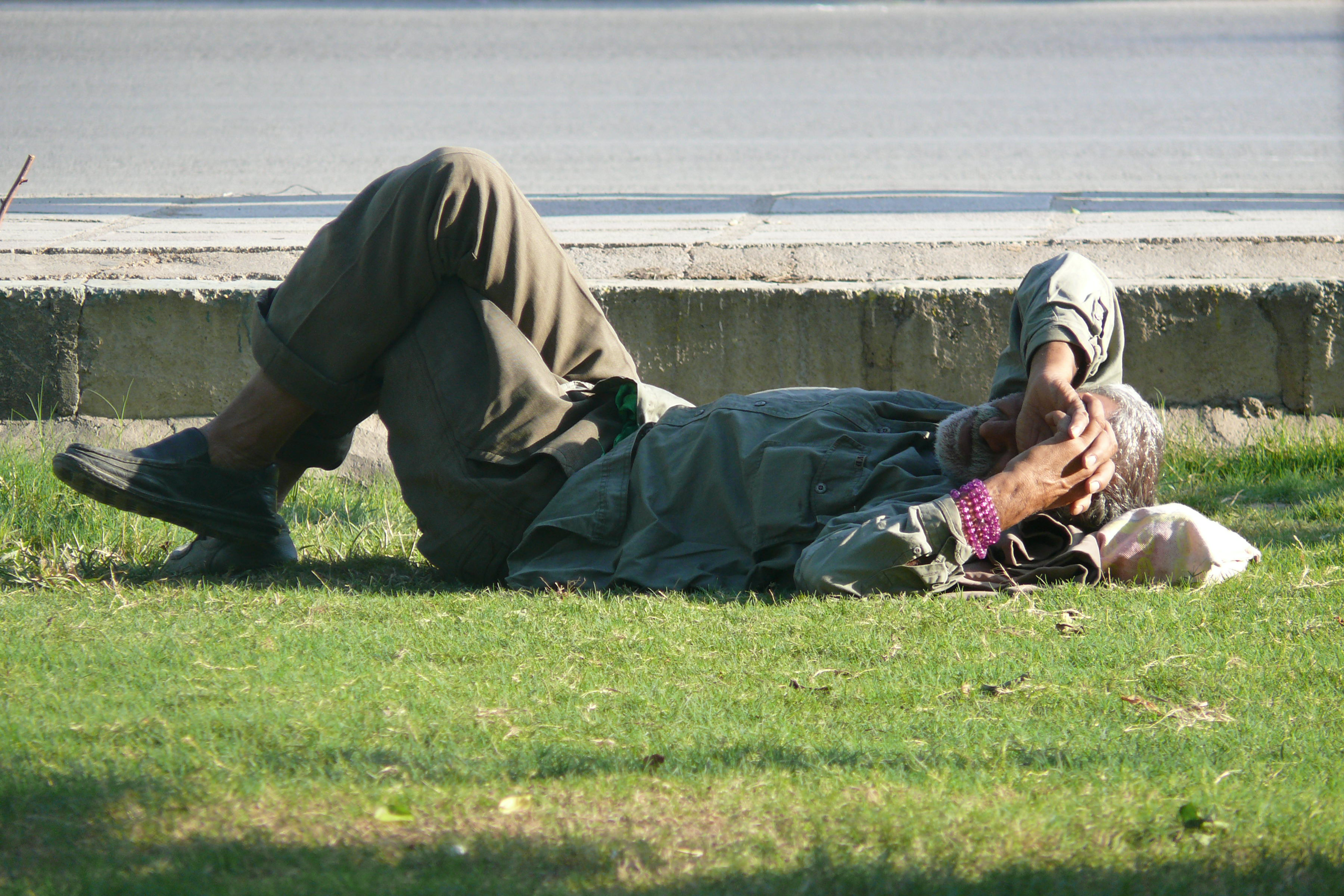
A homeless man in Ahvaz, Iran

The working class is part of the overall urban lower class, or mostazafin, a social stratum that includes all families whose household incomes place them marginally above, at, or below the officially defined poverty line. In cities with populations greater than 250,000, the lower class makes up an average of 40 to 50 percent of the total population; the lower-class proportion generally is less in smaller cities (50,000 to 250,000 population) and towns. In 2010, Iran's Department of Statistics announced that 10 million Iranians live under the absolute poverty line and 30 million live under the relative poverty line. 3 million laborers have been excluded from those statistics, as their data is not registered anywhere.

The lower class can be divided into two groups: the marginally poor, who receive regular incomes on a weekly or monthly basis; and the very poor, whose incomes vary from month to month and who thus experience difficulty in paying for food, housing, and utilities. Recipients of regular incomes include pensioners, industrial and construction workers, and people employed in the diverse services sector, such as attendants in barbershops, beauty salons, and public bathhouses, bakery workers, sales clerks, domestic servants, gardeners, garbage and trash collectors, painters and plasterers (of homes), porters, street cleaners, peddlers, street vendors, office cleaners, and laundry workers. These job categories, as well as others, also include at least one million workers who are employed only occasionally or seasonally, primarily as a result of the shortage of full-time positions in an economy that has had an official unemployment rate ranging between 10 and 15 percent of the labor force since the early 1990s. Although many government agencies and private charities provide assistance to the poor, a social stigma is associated with accepting such aid, especially among adult men, whom others judge according to their ability to support a family. Among some marginally poor people in the largest cities, especially families with female heads of household, there has been an increasing tendency since the mid-1990s to rely on begging to supplement income, A few poor neighborhoods in the largest cities, such as 'Khakh-e sefid' in southeastern Tehran Province, have acquired negative reputations because gangs have established safe houses there for illegal activities such as prostitution, gambling, and drug trafficking.

Out of the 15,000 homeless persons in Iran, 10,000 are men. There are between 60,000 and 200,000 street children in Iran.

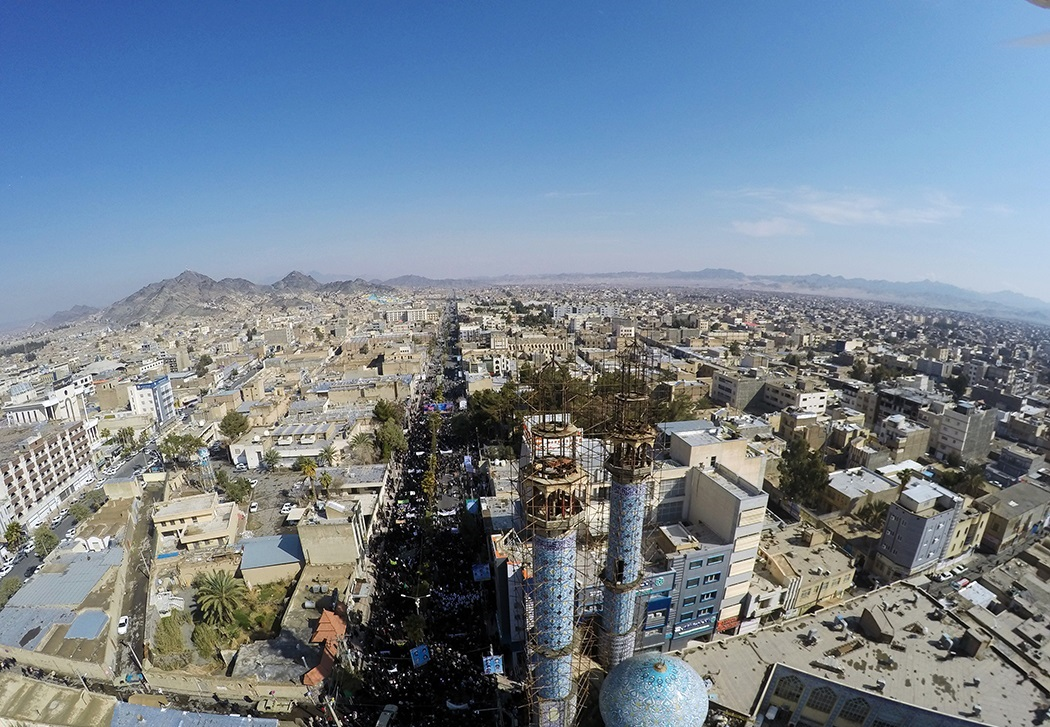
Sistan and Baluchistan has the worst quality of life and income levels across Iran.

== See also ==
- Construction in Iran
- Crime in Iran
- Demography of Iran
- Economy of Iran
- Education in Iran
- Government of Iran
- Healthcare in Iran
- Iranian Revolution
- Taxation in Iran
