= Iranzamin School =

Defunct international school in Iran (1967–1980)

Information
- Established: 1967
- Founders: Mary Ann Irvine; J. Richard Irvine
- Closed: 1981
- Teaching staff: 112
- Enrollment: 1450 (1978)

Iranzamin School, also known as Iranzamin International School of Tehran (Persian: مدرسه بین‌المللی ایران‌زمین تهران, romanized: Madreseh-ye Bayn ol-melali-e Irānzamin-e Tehrān) was a combined Iranian and American international school founded in 1967 in Tehran, Iran by J. Richard Irvine and Mary Ann Irvine. In 1978, at the dawn of the Iranian Revolution, it had 1,450 students from more than fifty countries, in addition to a faculty of 112 teachers from sixteen countries.

== History ==
Though Iranzamin school developed out of the American Community School, its roots go back to Alborz College and the efforts of Justin Perkins, an American Presbyterian missionary in Iran in the 19th century, who founded a church, school and printing house in Urmia in c. 1839.

Iranzamin School was a founding participant in the International Baccalaureate (IB) Organization and was licensed for the International Baccalaureate by Iran’s High Council of Education. Other founding IB schools were the Geneva International School, Atlantic College in Wales, the United Nations International School in New York, the Lycee International de St. Germain in France and the Goethe Gymnasium in Germany. The International Baccalaureate curriculum, culminating in a set of examinations, qualified successful secondary school graduates for admission to colleges and universities wherever they wished to study, including enrolling in higher education in Iran by virtue of the High Council of Education’s adoption of the International Baccalaureate.

As a result of the Islamic Revolution (1979), the school was winded down. In 1980, the last International Baccalaureate (IB) class graduated from Iranzamin, only numbering 24 students. In the 1980–1981 academic year, the new Islamic government of Iran allowed the relationship between Iranzamin and IB to lapse, and transformed Iranzamin into a traditional school for boys which followed a curriculum created by the government.

== Sources ==
- Irvine, J. Richard (2006). "IRANZAMIN, TEHRAN INTERNATIONAL SCHOOL". In Yarshater, Ehsan (ed.). Encyclopædia Iranica. Vol. XIII/5: Iran X. Religions in Iran–Iraq V. Safavid period. London and New York: Routledge & Kegan Paul. pp. 541–543. ISBN 978-0-933273-93-1.
- Irvine, David (18 April 2022). "Remembering Richard Irvine, Principal of Tehran's Iranzamin School". Kayhan Life.
