= Allameh Tabatabaei High School =

- دبیرستان علامه طباطبایی
- Logo
- Tehran, Iran

Information
- Other name: MAT School
- Type: Private
- Motto: "Service Before Self"
- Established: 1996
- Founder: Mr. Tofigh Hagh
- Website: http://www.atcce.com/ https://mat.ir/ https://alameh.ir

Allameh Tabatabaei High School, under supervision of Allameh Tabatabaei Complex of Cultural and Educational units (ATCCE), is a selective independent educational institution in Tehran, Iran, with six main campuses. It was registered as a High School, under the terms of the Ministry of Education Act of 26 May 1988 to prepare children for entering Iranian universities and to participate in National as well as International Science Olympiad competitions.

About 5,000 students apply for different campuses each year, but only about 5 to 10 percent of them can have the chance to be interviewed for registration.

Abshenasan primary school branch was established in 2013 near Abshenasan and Advance high school branches.

ATCCE split into two factions with identical names but different management behind them. The situation is as follows:

These belong to the "Knowledge & Manner" complex, under the supervision of Mr. Mohammad Jaafar Mostofi and His son, Sorush: North Kargar, Dr. Fatemi, Abshenasan(HS, Middle(Gamee No) and elementary) & Advanced, Abshenasan(Girls HS), Yusef Abad(Girls), Marzdaran(Elementary&Middle), Vanak(Elementary&Middle)

These belong to the "Andishe-Mehr" complex, under the supervision of Mr. Tofigh hagh: Niavaran(Elementary), Pasdaran(Elementary & Middle), Mirdamad - Abshenasan - Farmanieh - Golestan (All middle), Shariati & Farmanieh are HS

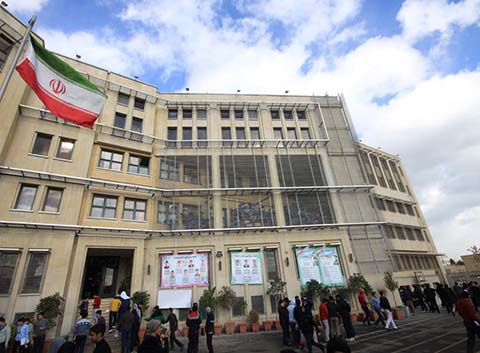
MAT school's main yard (Abshenasan Campus)

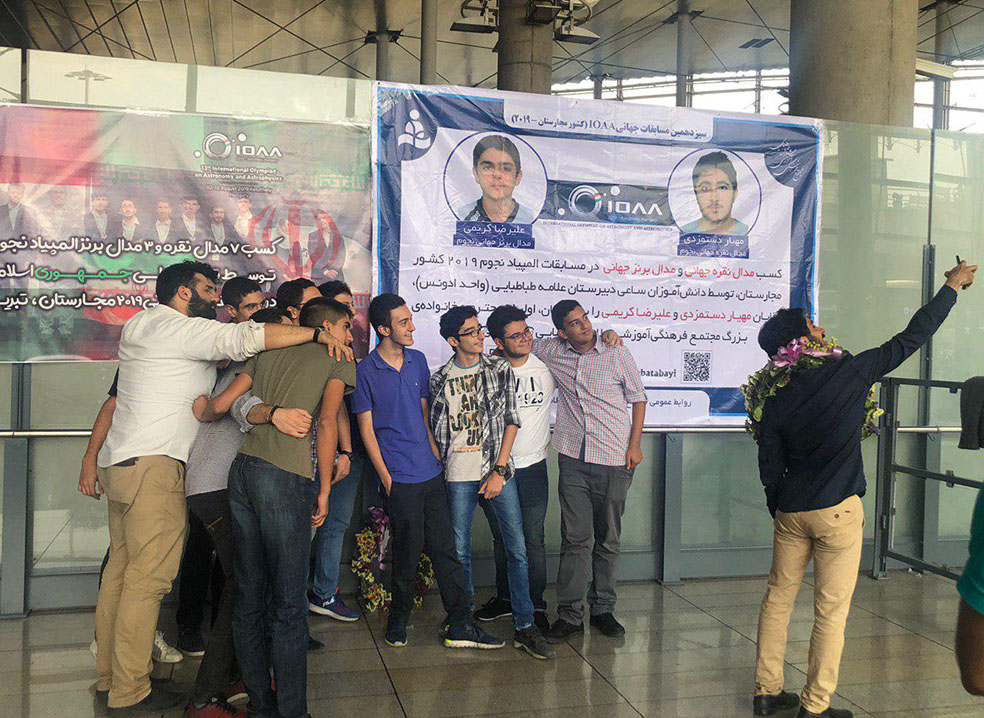
MAT students in International Astronomy Olympiad (2019)

== Campuses ==
The seven main ATCCE branches are:

- Advanced
- North Kargar
- Fatemi
- Abshenasan
- Amirabad
- Abshenasan
- YousefAbad
- Pasdaran
- Dr. Shariati
