= Farhangian University =

University in Iran

- دانشگاه فرهنگیان; Dāneshgāh-e Farhangiyān
- Type: Teacher education, Public university system
- Established: 2012
- Affiliations: Ministry of Education (Iran)
- Rector: Mehrzad Hamidi
- Students: 90,000
- Location: Iran
- Campus: 98 (64 branches and 34 dependent centers)
- Website: cfu.ac.ir

Farhangian University (Persian: دانشگاه فرهنگیان) is a public Teacher training university with more than 90 teacher-training colleges and a total enrollment exceeding 39,000, located in Iran. In 2012, in order to merge all teacher-training colleges, the Iranian Ministry of Education changed the name of Tarbiat Mo'allem (Persian: تربیت معلم) to Farhangian (Persian: فرهنگیان) and promoted colleges to the university status. Shahid Rajaee Teacher Training University is included in this university.

== Campuses and Centers ==
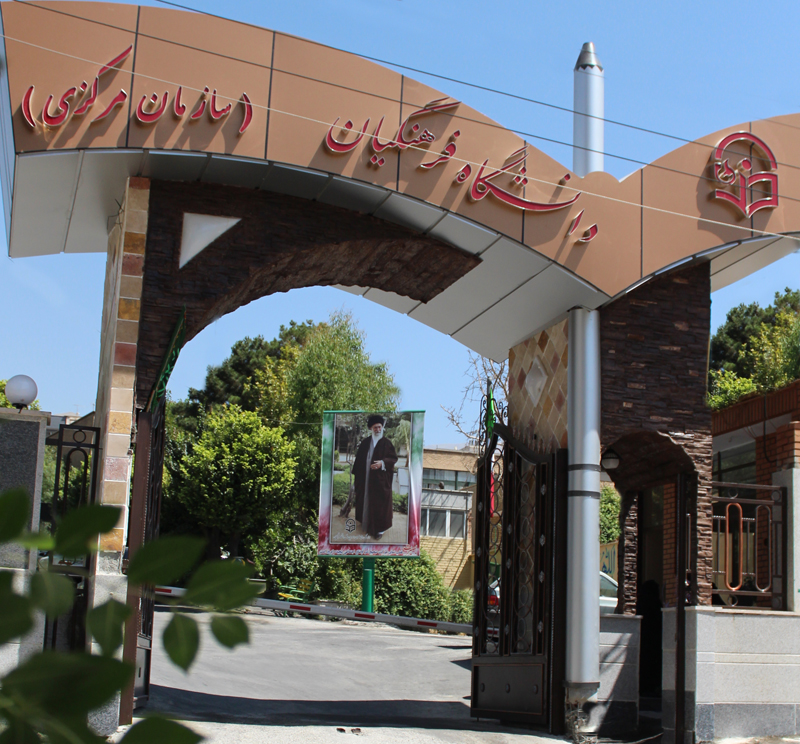
Central organization of Farhangian University (Tehran)

Farhangian University has centers (branches) located throughout the provinces of Iran. Each branch is divided into various sub-branches.

=== Farhangian University of Tehran ===
Farhangian University, Nasibeh

Farhangian University, Shahid Chamran

Farhangian University, Shahid Beheshti (Natural Science and Mathematics)

=== Farhangian University at Shiraz ===
Farhangian University, Rajaee

=== Farhangian University at Esfahan ===
Farhangian University, Rajaei

Farhangian University, Fatemeh Zahra

== Background ==
After the approval of the Supreme Cultural Revolution Council in 2011, and the aggregation of all teacher training centers, Farhangian University was established in January 2012. It is an umbrella organization with around 100 branches and 70,000 enrolled student teachers throughout the country.

The branches are teacher education centers that existed long before the university organization took shape. Farhangian University, affiliated with the Ministry of Education and run by the board of trustees, has legal, financial, and administrative autonomy.

== See also ==
- Education in Iran
