= Saint Peter Church, Tehran =

Iranian national heritage site

Coordinates: 35.69167017°N 51.41497761°E

Saint Peter Evangelical Church of Tehran
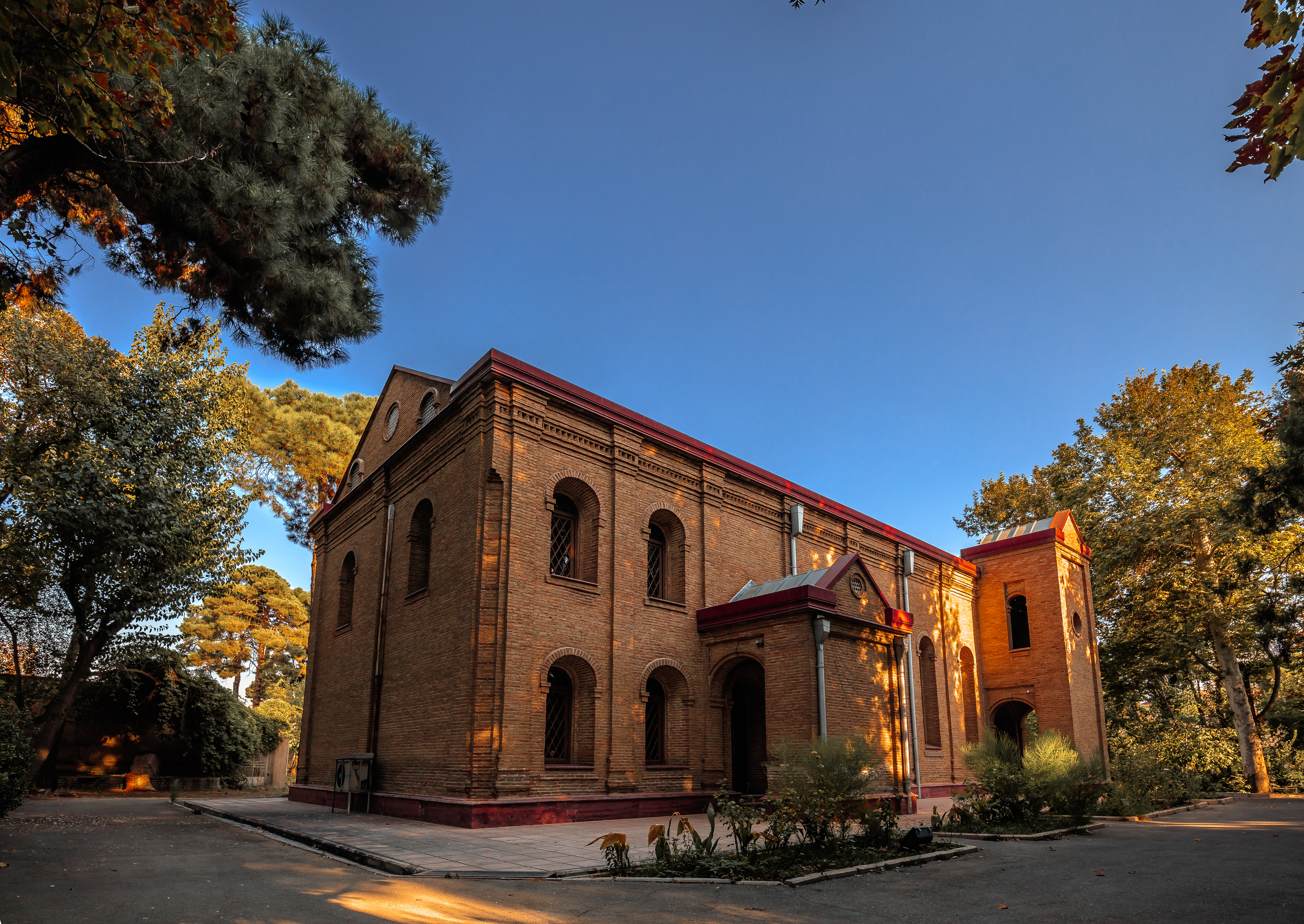
- Saint Peter Evangelical Church, Tehran

- Location within Iran

Religion
- Affiliation: Protestant
- Rite: Protestant
- Status: Functioning

Location
- Location: Qavam Street, Tehran, Iran

Architecture
- Completed: 1876

Saint Peter Evangelical Church of Tehran, (Persian: کلیسای انجیلی پطرس), is a Protestant church in Tehran, Iran.

== Location ==
The church is located in Si-e-Tir (Qavam-ol-Saltaneh) Street (خیابان قوام‌السلطنه) (fa), across the street from a synagogue, and not far from a Zoroastrian fire temple, an Orthodox Christian Church, and a large museum in a multicultural, multireligion neighborhood.

== History ==
The church was established in 1876 by American missionaries on land granted by Naser al-Din Shah Qajar. It is currently used by Armenian and Assyrian protestants as well as Korean expatriates in Iran.

== Gallery ==
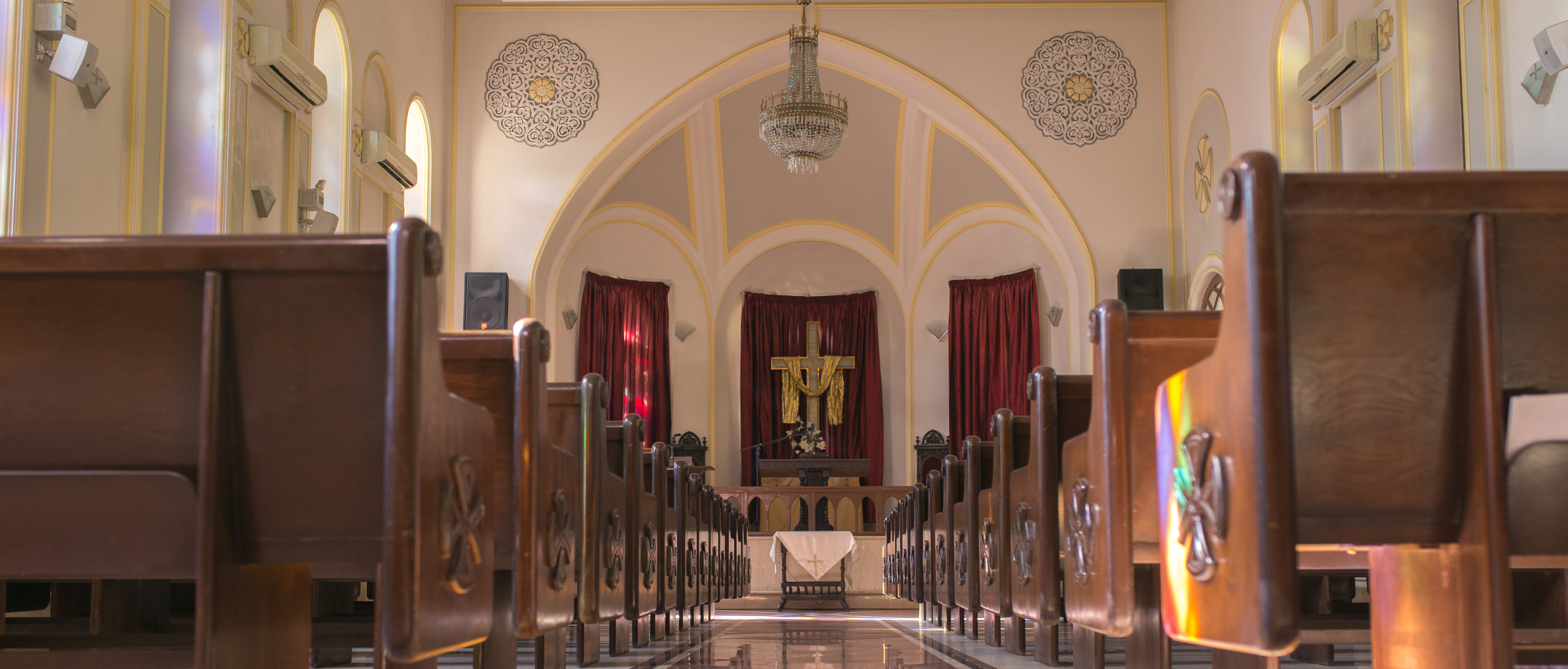
The interior of the church

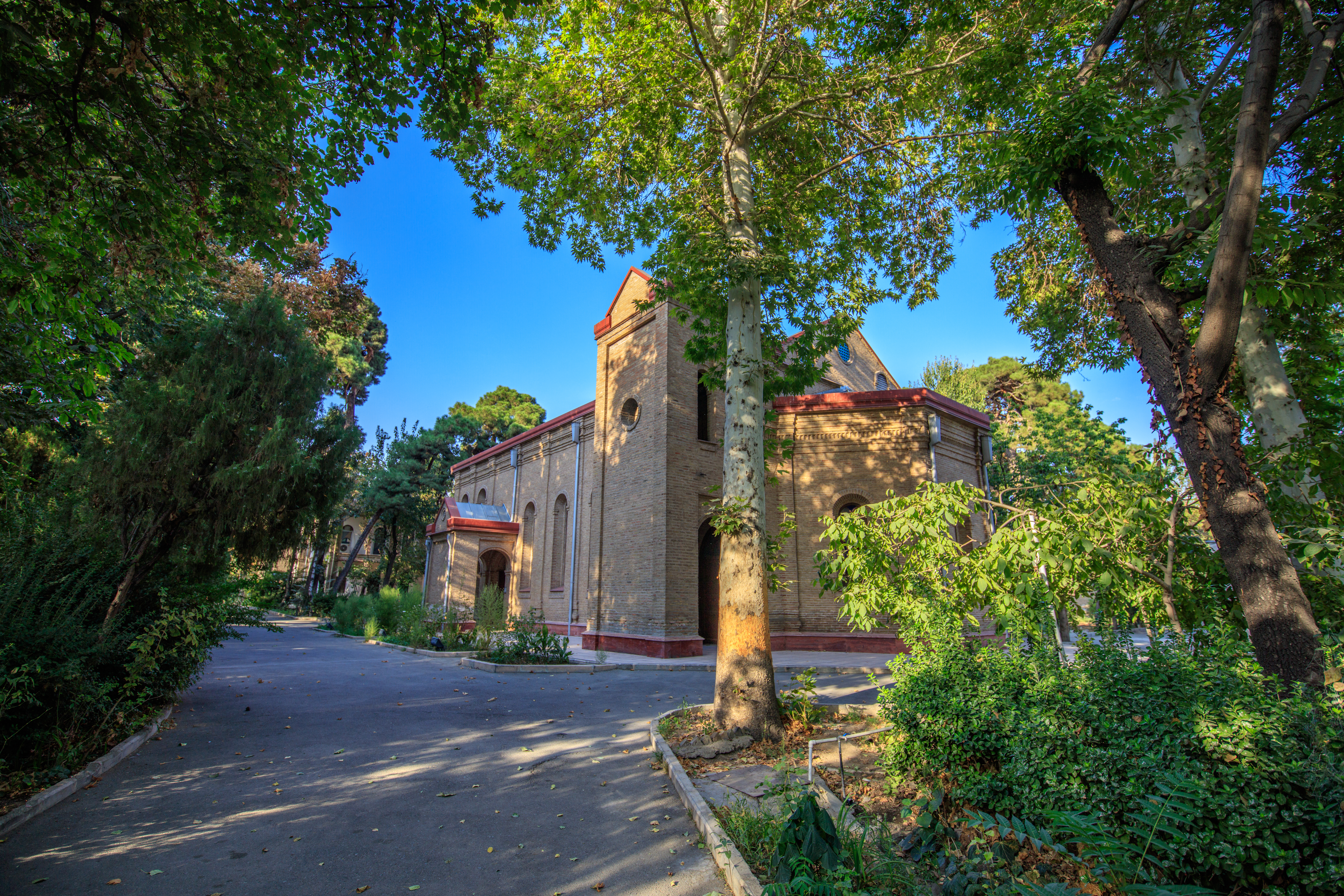
The garden of the church

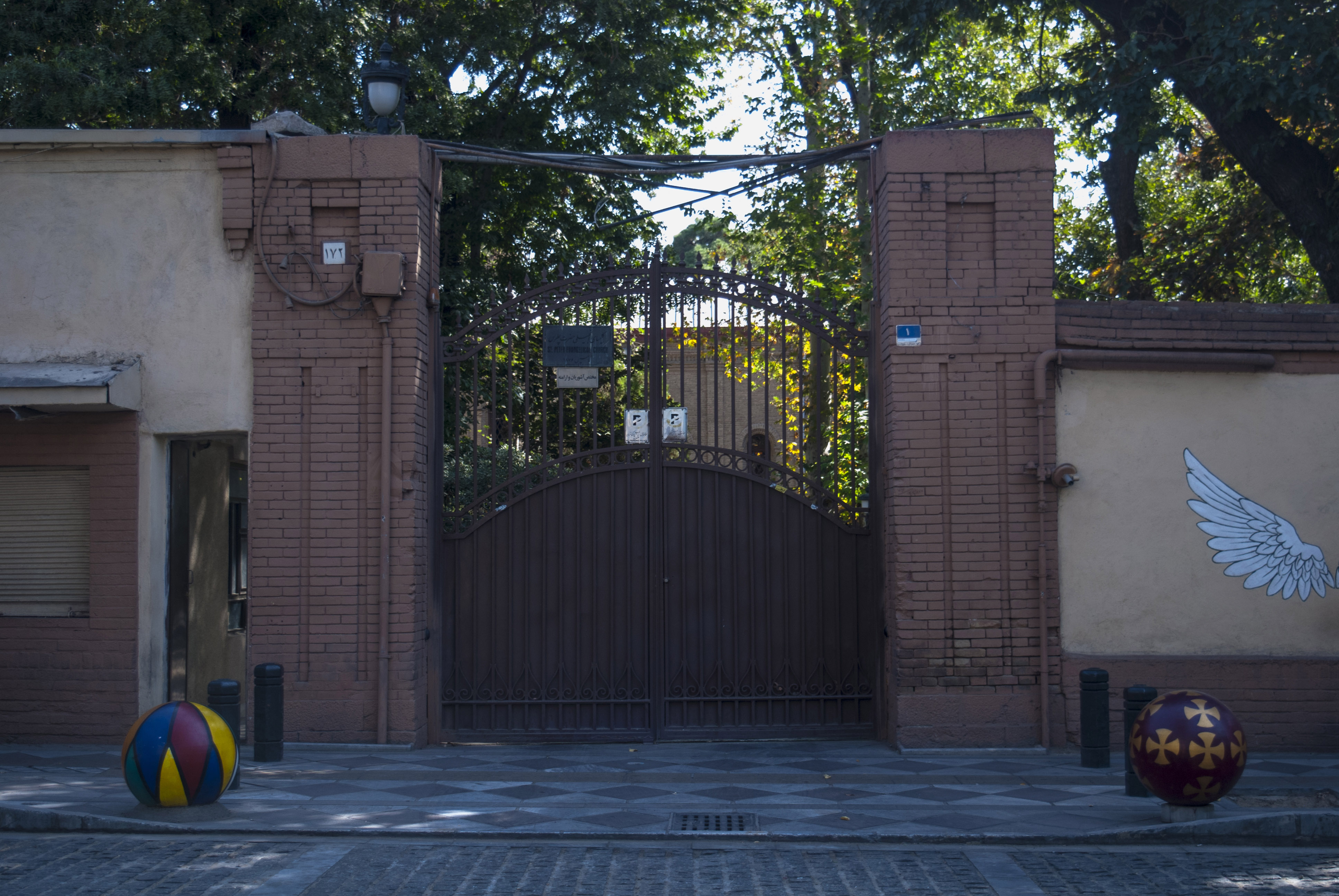
The gate to the church

== See also ==
- Christianity in Iran
- List of religious centers in Tehran
- Community School, Tehran
- Iran Bethel School
- James Bassett
