= Kanoon Farhangi Amoozesh =

Cultural education center

Kanoon Farhangi Amoozesh Ghalamchi
- Trade name: Kanoon Farhangi Amoozesh Ghalamchi
- Native name: کانون فرهنگی آموزش قلم چی
- Industry: Education
- Genre: Education, Publication
- Founded: Tehran, Iran (August 20, 1993) -->
- Founder: Kazem Ghalamchi
- Headquarters: Tehran, Iran
- Number of locations: About 400 branches in all Iran's cities
- Services: Mock exams, Books, CD, Online mock exams, Azmoon Magazine, Forsat-e-barabar Tv program, Zang-e-barnamerizi radio program
- Owner: Kazem Ghalamchi
- Website: www.kanoon.ir

Kanoon Farhangi Amoozesh (lit. Cultural Education Center) is a private organization in Iran’s educational sector, founded by Kazem Ghalamchi offering a wide range of educational products and services including bi-weekly exams, personal tutoring and educational books to 450,000 students all around the country who complete a Competitive examination for university seats. The institution has provided material financial support for the establishment of schools in poor provinces of Iran like Kurdistan and Sistan and Baluchestan.

In 1993, Kanoon held its first exam with around 100 students at Daneshjoo high school in Tehran. This service proved to be extremely popular, encouraging the rapid expansion of Kanoon around Iran and also the diversification of its services towards providing educational books, customized planning and personal tutoring.

These services were designed to allow students to evaluate their performance nationally through different periods, in order to show them where and how they could improve their learning. Kanoon also provides free books and membership for students experiencing financial difficulties. Kanoon also has numerous schools under the name "Saraye Danesh", which has branches all around Iran. Kanoon Publishing House is one of the leading organizations in Iran. Kanoon Publishing House is pioneered in educational book sector in Iran with the core idea of classifying reading subjects. One of the iconic attributes of Kanoon’s publishing is its classified educational books, which are branded in different colours.
