= List of schools in Iran =

This is a list of primary schools and secondary schools located in the Asian country of Iran. Tertiary schools are listed at the List of universities in Iran.

== Ahvaz ==
- Dar al-Funun High School
- Shahed Misagh High School
- Azadi High School
- Shahid Beheshti High School (Sampad)
- Hazrat-e-Ma'soumeh High School

== Isfahan ==
Schools in the city of Isfahan, Isfahan province, include:

- Shahid Mohammad Mahdi Nillfourooshzade High school (magnet school)
- Esfahan Schools
- Emam Mohammad Bagher High School
- Safoora High School
- Shahid Saaed Hashemi High School (Magnet school)
- Khomeyni's Schools
- Safavi Schools
- Tiz Hoshan Schools

== Tehran ==
Schools in the city of Tehran, Tehran province, include:

- Ahrar Vocational School
- Alborz School (magnet school)
- Allameh Helli School (magnet school)
- Farzanegan 1 school (magnet school)
- Allameh Tabatabaei School (magnet school)
- Ayeen Tarbiat-Ekbatan
- Atomic Energy School (magnet school)
- Kamal High-school
- Mizan School
- Mofid High Schools
- Nazam Military High school Tehran
- Nokhbegan e Allameh Tabatabaei Schools
- Rouzbeh Schools
- Roshd Highschool (magnet school)
- Salam School (magnet school)
- Shahid Rajaei Upper Secondary
- Tehran International School

== Mashhad ==
Schools in the city of Mashhad, Razavi Khorasan province, include:

- Allameh Tabatabaei Educational and Cultural centre
- Ardakani Middle School (governmental school)
- Besat Educational Complex
- Farzanegan (1-2-3-4-5) High Schools (Sampad)
- Farzanegan (1–2–3) Middle Schools (Sampad)
- Hashemi Nejad (1-2-3-4) Middle Schools (Sampad)
- Imam Reza Educational Complex (High School & Middle school)
- Kosar Middle School
- Meftah high schools
- Mosalla Nejad Educational Complex
- Omidvar Educational Complex
- Shahid Hashemi Nejad (1-2-3-4) High Schools (Sampad)
- Sherkat Farsh high school
- Shokooh-e- Iranian School (International School)

== Karaj ==
Schools in the city of Karaj, Alborz province, include:

- Shahid Soltani School
- Farzanegan School
- Alborz High School
- Dehkhoda High School
- Dr. Hesabi High School
- Dr. Moein High School
- Kashanipour High School
- Shahid Beheshti High School
- Shahid Rahimi High School
- Shahid Rajaee High School

== Dezful ==
- Sheikh Morteza Ansari school
- Dr. Moḥammad Moin Middle School
- Shahid Bahonar Pre-university Center

== Shiraz ==
Schools in the city of Shiraz, Fars province, include:

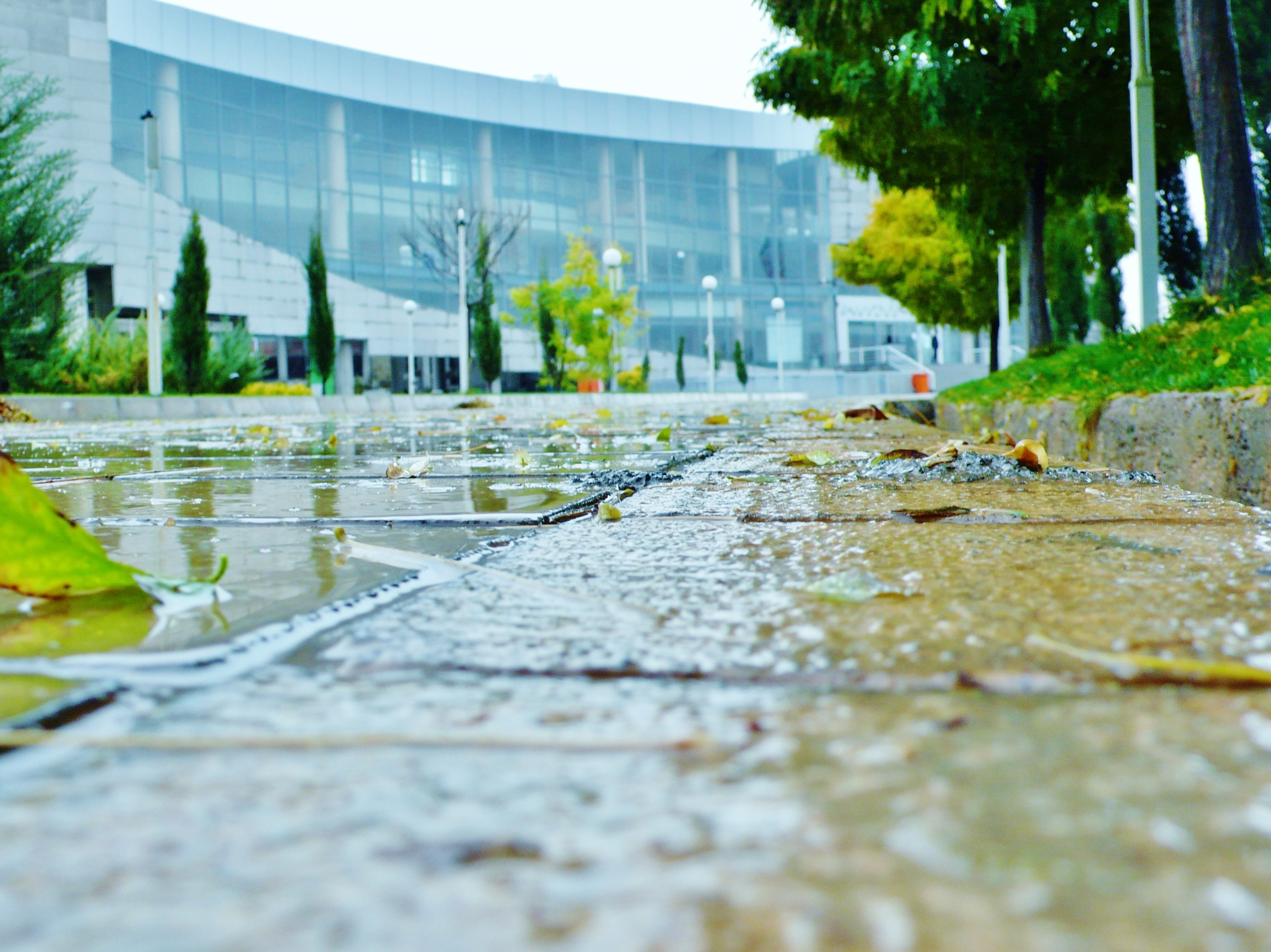
Emamreza School

- Alavi School
- Dastgheib (Tizhooshan) 1, 2 & 3
- Dr. Hessabi Schools
- Ebn Sina School
- Ehsan School
- Emam Reza School
- Farzanegans (Tizhooshans)
- Fereshtegan School
- Haj Ghavam School
- Meraj School
- Nia Kowsari School
- Oloom Pezeshki School
- Shahed Schools
- Yas School
- Haniyeh Schools

=== Other schools ===
- Aftab Azarin (Ecole Bilingue De Teheran) School
- Armenian Schools in Iran
- Azadi Schools
- Bahman Schools (22)
- Derakhshesh Schools
- Dr Gharib Schools
- Dr. Hesabi School
- Dr Shariaaty Schools
- Emam Schools
- Atomic Energy Schools
- Enghelab Islamy Schools
- Farvardin Schools (12)
- Germany's School in Iran
- Golestan Schools
- Iran's Schools
- Khomeyni's Schools
- Kooshesh School
- Leader Schools
- Mehraein Schools
- Modern Schools
- Omid Schools
- President Schools
- Public Islamic of Iran
- Refah Schools
- Shahid Bahonar Schools
- Salam Schools
- Salehin High School
- Sarsabz Schools
- Shahid Beheshty Schools
- Shahid Motahary Schools
- Shahid Rajaee Schools
- Soodeh High School
- Tehran Schools
- Tiz Hoshan Schools
- Toloo High School
- World's School in Iran

== Yazd ==
Schools in the city of Yazd, Yazd province, include:

- Iranshahr High School

== See also ==
- Education in Iran
- Lists of schools
