= Allameh Helli No.3 High School =

Allameh Helli 3
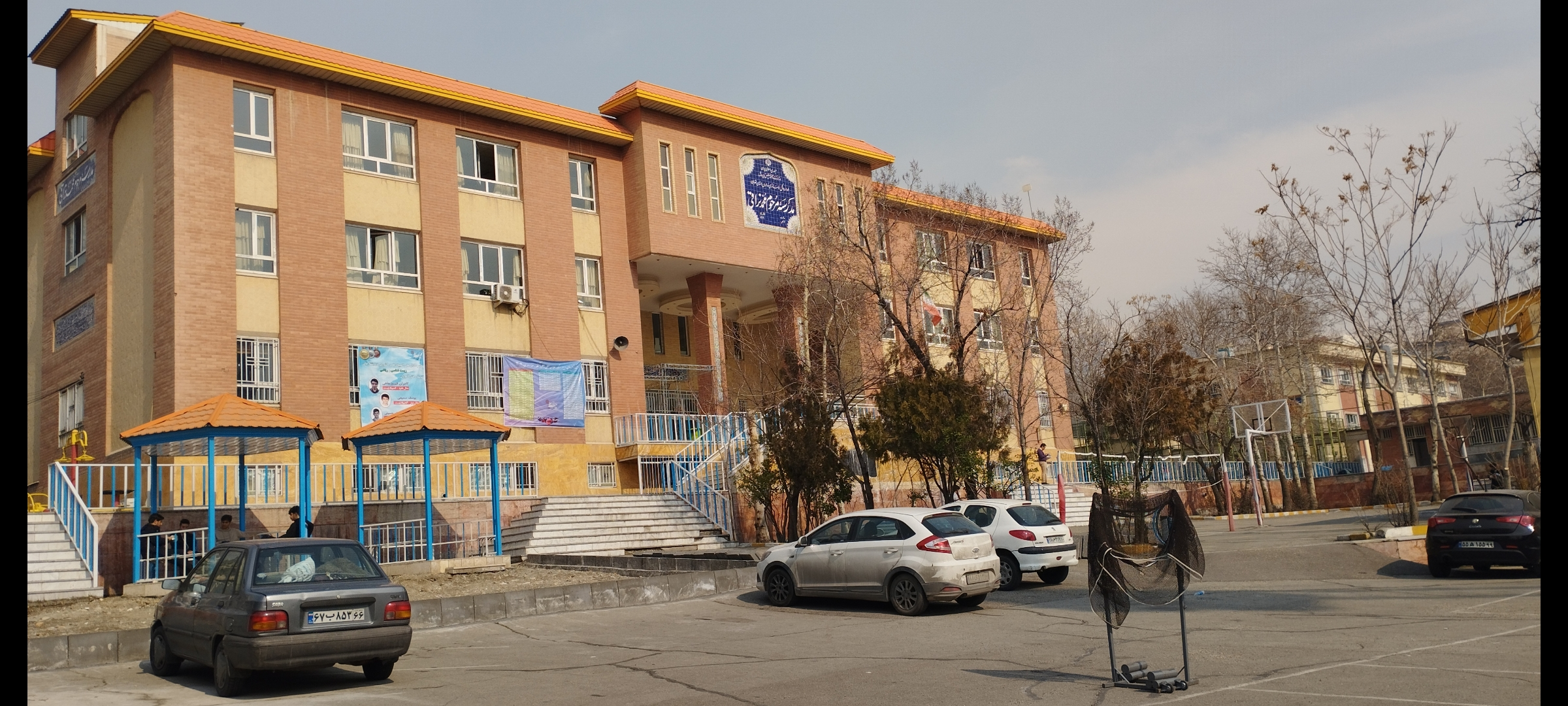
- Allameh Helli 3

Location
- Feyziyeh Street, Niavaran; Tehran; Iran
- Coordinates: 35°48′47.819″N 51°27′45.115″E

Information
- Type: NODET
- Established: 2008
- Headteacher: Mr. dehrooyeh
- Gender: Male
- Age: 15 to 18
- Enrollment: 350
- School type: NODET
- Website: http://www.helli3.ir/

Allameh Helli No.3 High School is an education center established in 2008. It was the second NODET high school in the Iranian capital city of Tehran. The naming of the school was based on its former status as the third established NODET guidance school. However, even though Allameh Helli became separated from NODET two years following inception, the name of the high school did not change.

== About the school ==
Facilities include laboratories, administrative, classes, computer suites, hall and praying room. The school is four stories high. In 2011, the school population was around 350. The school is located in the "Niavaran" district. School achievements include obtaining Olympiad medals and taking part in 2011 global RoboCup competitions.

== Science and Technology Fair ==
It has been a tradition in NODET high schools for an exhibition to be organized every year where the students are able to present projects and research conducted in an academic year. This exhibition is based on their extra curricular activities and courses taken by the students including field such as: physics, computer science, mathematics, chemistry, biology, electronics, humanities, robotics and religious studies.

The exhibition is organized mostly by the students. Every year a president is selected from the second year students by vote. Activities such as designing the fair's poster, designing logos, inviting other schools, finding sponsors, allocating locations, decoration of the school and most of the executive procedures are carried out by the students themselves.

== Achievements ==
Students gained 10 national medals (one of which was gold) in the 2011 National Olympiad and obtained eighth place in the 2011 RoboCup in Istanbul. Students have also shown in the "Kharazmi" exhibition by gaining national rankings in both robotics and science projects.

== NODET ==
"NODET" stands for National Organization for Development of Extraordinary Talents (SAMPAD in Persian). It used to be a separate organization funded by the government, designed for outstanding students around the country. In 2009, it was combined with the Ministry of Education and therefore weakened substantially. It is a chain of schools which are located in the center of most provinces in two levels: high school and guidance school.

Sampad has had some notable alumni including people like Maryam Mirzakhani, Iman Eftekhari, Reza Amirkhani, Elshan Moradi, and Roozbeh Poornader. Many of students from SAMPAD enter Iranian universities such as Sharif University of Technology and Tehran University. Many pursue higher education in universities around the world. High standards and research based education makes NODET schools very popular around the country; every year thousands of gifted students participate in an initiation test in order to gain entrance to these schools.

== See also ==
- Gifted education
- NODET
- Allameh Helli High Schools
- Farzanegan School
