= Gifted education =

Accelerated learning provision

Gifted education (also known as gifted and talented education (GATE), talented and gifted programs (TAG), or G&T education) encompasses various forms of teaching to students identified as exceptional.

The main approaches to gifted education are enrichment and acceleration. An enrichment program teaches additional, deeper material, while still allowing the student to progress through the curriculum at the same rate as their peers. For example, after gifted students have completed the standard curriculum, an enrichment program might provide them with additional information about a subject. An acceleration program advances the student through the standard curriculum faster than normal. This is normally done by having the students skip one to two grades.

Being gifted and talented usually means being able to score in the top percentile on IQ exams. The percentage of students selected varies, generally with 10% or fewer being selected for gifted education programs.

Accelerated provisions for education date back to the time of Plato and the Tang dynasty and are implemented around the world. Measures of giftedness, and intelligence more broadly, are debated, and the assessment and provisions of gifted education can be a site of controversy and inequality.

== Education Types ==
Attempts to provide gifted education can be classified in several ways. Most gifted students benefit from a combination of approaches at different times.

=== Cluster grouping ===
Cluster grouping is the gathering of four to six gifted, talented, or high-achieving students in a single classroom for the entire school day. Cluster teachers are specially trained in differentiating for gifted learners. Within a cluster group, instruction may include enrichment and extensions, higher-order thinking skills, pretesting and differentiation, compacting, an accelerated pace, and more complex content.

=== Compacting ===
In compacting, the regular school material is compacted by pretesting the student to establish which skills and content have already been mastered. Pretests can be presented on a daily basis (pupils doing the most difficult items on a worksheet first and skipping the rest if they are completed correctly), or before a unit of instruction lasting a week or longer. When a student demonstrates an appropriate level of proficiency, further repetitive practice can be safely skipped, thus reducing boredom and freeing up time for the student to work on more challenging material.

=== Enrichment ===
At the primary school level, students spend all class time with their peers but receive extra material to challenge them. Enrichment may be as simple as a modified assignment provided by the regular classroom teacher, or it might include formal programs such as Odyssey of the Mind, Destination Imagination or academic competitions such as Brain Bowl, Future Problem Solving, Science Olympiad, National History Day, science fairs, or spelling bees. Programmes of enrichment activities may also be organised outside the school day (e.g. the ASCEND project in secondary science education). This work is done in addition to, and not instead of, any regular school work assigned. Critics of this approach argue that it requires gifted students to do more work instead of the same amount at an advanced level. At the secondary school level, students may take additional courses in subjects such as English, Spanish, Latin, philosophy, or science, or participate in extracurricular activities. Some perceive there to be a necessary choice between enrichment and acceleration, as if the two were mutually exclusive alternatives. However, other researchers see the two as complements to each other.

=== Pull-out ===
Gifted students are pulled out of a heterogeneous classroom to spend a portion of their time in a gifted class. These programs vary widely, from carefully designed half-day academic programs to a single hour each week of educational challenges. Generally, these programs are ineffective at promoting academic advancement unless the material covered contains extensions and enrichment to the core curriculum. The majority of pull-out programs include an assortment of critical thinking drills, creative exercises, and subjects typically not introduced in standard curricula. Much of the material introduced in gifted pull-out programs deals with the study of logic, and its application to fields ranging from philosophy to mathematics. Students are encouraged to apply these empirical reasoning skills to every aspect of their education both in and outside of class.

=== Acceleration ===
People are advanced to a higher-level class covering material more suited to their abilities and preparedness. This may take the form of skipping grades or completing the normal curriculum in a shorter-than-normal period of time ("telescoping"). Subject acceleration (also called partial acceleration) is a flexible approach that can advance a student in one subject, such as mathematics or language, without changing other studies, such as history or science. This type of acceleration is usually based upon achievement testing, rather than IQ.

Some colleges offer early entrance programs that give gifted younger students the opportunity to attend college early. In the U.S., many community colleges allow advanced students to enroll with the consent of school officials and the pupil's parents.

Acceleration presents gifted children with academic material from established curricula that is commensurate with their ability and preparedness, and for this reason is a low-cost option from the perspective of the school. This may result in a small number of children taking classes targeted at older children. For the majority of gifted students, acceleration is beneficial both academically and socially. Whole grade skipping is considered rapid acceleration. Some advocates have argued that the disadvantages of being retained in a standard mixed-ability classroom are substantially worse than any shortcomings of acceleration. For example, psychologist Miraca Gross reports: "the majority of these children [retained in a typical classroom] are socially rejected [by their peers with typical academic talents], isolated, and deeply unhappy. Children of IQ 180+ who are retained in the regular classroom are at increased risk and experience severe emotional distress." These accelerated children should be placed together in one class if possible. Research suggests that acceleration might have an impact long after students graduate from high school. For example, one study shows that high-IQ individuals who experienced full-grade acceleration earned higher incomes as adults.

=== Self-pacing ===
Self-pacing can be beneficial for all children and is not targeted specifically at those identified as gifted or talented. A 2023 systematic review found that Montessori education has a generally positive effect on children's academic outcomes.

=== Summer enrichment ===
Summer enrichment programs offer a variety of courses that primarily take place during the summer. Summer schools are popular in the United States. Such programs typically charge an entrance fee and focus on one subject or class for the duration of the camp.

Several examples of this type of program are:

- Center for Talented Youth
- CTYI
- GERI: Gifted Education Resource Institute, Purdue University
- Johns Hopkins University
- Center for Talent Development, Northwestern University

Within the United States, in addition to programs designed by the state, some counties also choose to form their own Talented and Gifted Programs. Sometimes this means that an individual county will form its own TAG program; sometimes several counties will come together if not enough gifted students are present in a single county. Generally, a TAG program focuses on a specific age group, particularly the local TAG programs. This could mean elementary age, high school age, or by years such as ages 9 through 14.

These classes are generally organized so that students have the opportunity to choose several courses they wish to participate in. Courses offered often vary between subjects, but are not typically strictly academically related to that subject. For example, a TAG course that could be offered in history could be the students learning about a certain event and then acting it out in a performance to be presented to parents on the last night of the program. These courses are designed to challenge the students to think in new ways and not merely to be lectured as they are in school.

=== Full-time separate classes or schools ===
Some gifted students are educated in either a separate class or a separate school. These classes and schools are sometimes called "congregated gifted programs" or "dedicated gifted programs."

Some independent schools have a primary mission to serve the needs of the academically gifted. Such schools are relatively scarce and often difficult for families to locate. One resource for locating gifted schools in the United States can be found on the National Association for Gifted Children's resource directory accessible through their home page. Such schools often need to work to guard their mission from occasional charges of elitism, support the professional growth and training of their staff, write curriculum units that are specifically designed to meet the social, emotional, and academic talents of their students, and educate their parent population at all ages.

Some gifted and talented classes offer self-directed or individualized studies, where the students lead a class themselves and decide on their own task, tests, and all other assignments. These separate classes or schools tend to be more expensive than regular classes, due to smaller class sizes and lower student-to-teacher ratios. Not-for-profit schools often can offer lower costs than for-profit schools. Either way, they are in high demand and parents often have to pay part of the costs.

== Identifying gifted children ==
The term "Gifted Assessment" is typically applied to a process of using norm-referenced psychometric tests administered by a qualified psychologist or psychometrist with the goal of identifying children whose intellectual functioning is significantly advanced as compared to the appropriate reference group (i.e., individuals of their age, gender, and country). The cut-off score for differentiating this group is usually determined by district school boards and may differ by area. However, most define the group as students scoring in the top two percentiles on one of the accepted tests of intellectual (cognitive) functioning or IQ. Some school boards also require a child to demonstrate advanced academic standing on individualized achievement tests and/or through their classroom performance. Identifying gifted children is often difficult but is very important because typical school teachers are not qualified to educate a gifted student. This can lead to a situation where a gifted child is bored, underachieves, and misbehaves in class.

Individual IQ testing is one method to identify giftedness among children. Because it does not distinguish well among those found to be gifted, examiners prefer using a variety of tests to first identify giftedness and then further differentiate. This is often done by using individual IQ tests coupled with group or individual achievement tests. There is no standard consensus on which tests to use, as each test is better suited for a certain role. The two most popular tests for identifying giftedness in the school-age population are the WISC-V and the SB5. The WIAT-4 is considered the most popular academic achievement test to determine a child's aggregate learned knowledge.

Testing alone cannot accurately identify every gifted child. Teacher and parent nominations are essential additions to the objective information provided by grades and scores. Parents are encouraged to keep portfolios of their children's work, and documentation of their early signs of gifted behavior.

== Studies of giftedness ==
The development of early intelligence tests by Alfred Binet led to the Stanford-Binet IQ test developed by Lewis Terman. Terman began long-term studies of gifted children with a view to checking if the popular view "early ripe, early rot" was true. The Terman Genetic Studies of Genius longitudinal study has been described by successor researchers who conducted the study after Terman's death and also by an independent researcher who had full access to the study files.

Studies by James and Kulik conclude that gifted students benefit least from working in a mixed-level class, and benefit most from learning with other similarly advanced students in accelerated or enriched classes.

=== Definition of giftedness ===
Educational authorities differ on the definition of giftedness: even when using the same IQ test to define giftedness, they may disagree on what gifted means—one may take up the top two percent of the population, another might take up the top five percent of a population, which may be within a state, district, or school. Within a single school district, there can be substantial differences in the distribution of measured IQ. The IQ for the top percentile at a high-performing school may be quite different from that at a lower performing school.

The National Association for Gifted Children in the United States defines giftedness as marked ability or achievement and can be in many areas, such as maths, music, or dance.

Peter Marshall obtained his doctorate in 1995, for research carried out in this field in the years from 1986. At the time, he was the first Research Director of the Mensa Foundation for Gifted Children. His work challenged the difficult childhood hypothesis, concluding that gifted children, by and large, do not have any more difficult childhoods than mainstream children and, in fact, that where they do, their giftedness probably helps them cope better than mainstream children and provided the material for his subsequent book Educating a Gifted Child.

Susan K. Johnsen (2004) explains that gifted children all exhibit the potential for high performance in the areas included in the United States federal definition of gifted and talented students:

The term 'gifted and talented' when used in respect to students, children, or youth means [those who show] evidence of high performance capability in areas such as intellectual, creative, artistic, or leadership capacity, or in specific academic fields, and who require services or activities not ordinarily provided by the school in order to fully develop such capabilities.

— P.L. 103–382, Title XIV, p. 388

==== Reliance on IQ ====
In her book, Identifying Gifted Students: A Practical Guide, Susan K. Johnsen (2004) writes that schools should use a variety of measures of students' capability and potential when identifying gifted children. These measures may include portfolios of student work, classroom observations, achievement measures, and intelligence scores. Most educational professionals accept that no single measure can be used in isolation to accurately identify every gifted child.

== History ==
=== Classical era to Renaissance ===
Gifted and talented education dates back thousands of years. Plato (c. 427–c. 347 BCE) advocated providing specialized education for intellectually gifted young men and women. In China's Tang dynasty (580–618 CE), child prodigies were summoned to the imperial court for specialized education. Throughout the Renaissance, those who exhibited creative talent in art, architecture, and literature were supported by both the government and private patronage.

=== Francis Galton ===
Francis Galton conducted one of the earliest Western studies of human intellectual abilities. Between 1888 and 1894, Galton tested more than 7,500 individuals to measure their natural intellectual abilities. He found that if a parent deviates from the norm, so will the child, but to a lesser extent than the parent. This was one of the earliest observed examples of regression toward the mean. Galton believed that individuals could be improved through interventions in heredity, a movement he named eugenics. He categorized individuals as gifted, capable, average, or degenerate, and he recommended breeding between the first two categories, and forced abstinence for the latter two. His term for the most intelligent and talented people was "eminent". After studying England's most prominent families, Galton concluded that one's eminence was directly related to the individual's direct line of heredity.

=== Lewis Terman ===
At Stanford University in 1918, Lewis Terman adapted Alfred Binet's Binet-Simon intelligence test into the Stanford-Binet test, and introduced intelligence quotient (IQ) scoring for the test. According to Terman, the IQ was one's mental age compared to one's chronological age, based on the mental age norms he compiled after studying a sample of children. He defined intelligence as "the ability to carry on abstract thinking". During World War I Terman was a commissioned officer of the United States Army, and collaborated with other psychologists in developing intelligence tests for new recruits to the armed forces. For the first time, intelligence testing was given to a wide population of drafted soldiers.

After the war, Terman undertook an extensive longitudinal study of 643 children in California who scored at IQ 140 or above, the Genetic Studies of Genius, continuing to evaluate them throughout their lives. Subjects of these case studies were called "Termites" and the studies contacted the children in 1921, and again in 1930, 1947, and 1959 after his death. Terman's studies have to date been the most extensive on high-functioning children, and are still quoted in psychological literature today. Terman claimed to have disproven common misconceptions, such as that highly intelligent children were prone to ill physical and mental health, that their intelligence burned out early in their lives, or that they either achieved greatly or underachieved.

=== Leta Hollingworth ===
A professional colleague of Terman's, Leta Hollingworth was the first in the United States to study how best to serve students who showed evidence of high performance on tests. Although recognizing Terman's and Galton's beliefs that heredity played a vital role in intelligence, Hollingworth gave similar credit to home environment and school structure. Hollingworth worked to dispel the pervasive belief that "bright children take care of themselves" and emphasized the importance of early identification, daily contact, and grouping gifted children with others with similar abilities. Hollingworth performed an 18-year-long study of 50 children in New York City who scored 155 or above on the Stanford-Binet, and studied smaller groups of children who scored above a 180. She also ran a school in New York City for bright students that employed a curriculum of student-led exploration, as opposed to a teacher providing students with a more advanced curriculum they would encounter later in life.

=== Cold War ===
One unforeseen result of the launch of Sputnik by the Soviet Union was the immediate emphasis on education for bright students in the United States, and this settled the question whether the federal government should get involved in public education at all. The National Defense Education Act (NDEA) was passed by Congress in 1958 with $1 billion US to bolster science, math, and technology in public education. The National Defense Education Act would lead to other achievements such as forerunning the moon landing and the implementation of Advanced Placement, (A.P.), coursework. Educators immediately pushed to identify gifted students and serve them in schools. Students chosen for gifted services were given intelligence tests with a strict cutoff, usually at 130, which meant that students who scored below 130 were not identified.

=== Marland Report ===
The impact of the NDEA was evident in schools for years after, but a study on how effective education was meeting the needs of gifted students was initiated by the United States Department of Education in 1969. The Marland Report, completed in 1972, for the first time presented a general definition of giftedness, and urged districts to adopt it. The report also allowed students to show high functioning on talents and skills not measurable by an intelligence test. The Marland Report defined gifted as

"Children capable of high performance include those with demonstrated achievement and/or potential ability in any of the following areas, singly or in combination:

1. General intellectual ability,
2. Specific academic aptitude,
3. Creativity or productive thinking,
4. Leadership ability,
5. Visual and performing arts, or
6. Psychomotor ability."

The report's definition continues to be the basis of the definition of giftedness in most districts and states.

=== A Nation at Risk ===
In 1983, the result of an 18-month-long study of secondary students was published as A Nation at Risk, and claimed that students in the United States were no longer receiving superior education, and in fact, could not compete with students from other developed countries in many academic exercises. One of the recommendations the book made was to increase services to gifted education programs, citing curriculum enrichment or acceleration specifically. The US federal government was also urged to create standards for the identification and servicing of gifted students.

=== Jacob Javits Gifted and Talented Students Education Act ===
The Jacob Javits Gifted and Talented Students Education Act was passed in 1988 as part of the Elementary and Secondary Education Act (ESEA). Instead of funding district-level gifted education programs, the Javits Act instead has three primary components: the research of effective methods of testing, identification, and programming, which is performed at the National Research Center on the Gifted and Talented; the awarding of grants to colleges, states, and districts that focus on underrepresented populations of gifted students; and grants awarded to state and districts for program implementation.

Annual funding for grants must be passed by US Congress, and totaled $9.6 million US in 2007, but the money is not promised. While he was president, George W. Bush eliminated the money every year of his term, but members of Congress overrode the president to make sure the grant money was distributed.

=== No Child Left Behind ===
In 2001, a newer US federal education initiative of No Child Left Behind (NCLB) was passed and was signed into law in 2002. The goal was to bring the proficiency of all students to grade level, but critics noted it did not address the needs of gifted students who performed above grade level. The act imposed punishments on schools, administrators, and teachers when students did not achieve to the plan's designs, but did not address any achievement standards for high-functioning students, forcing schools and teachers to focus their time with low-achieving students. An article in The Washington Post declared, "The unmistakable message to teachers – and to students – is that it makes no difference whether a child barely meets the proficiency standard or far exceeds it." Gifted services eroded as a result of the legislation, according to a 2006 article in The New York Times.

=== Every Student Succeeds Act ===
The No Child Left Behind (NCLB) Act became increasingly unworkable for schools and educators and was scheduled for revision in 2007. A review of the Elementary and Secondary Education Act (ESEA) signed into law in 1965 also came due and, beginning in 2010, the US federal government worked to update both of these laws, creating the new Every Student Succeeds Act (ESSA).

This new law advanced equity by upholding critical protections for America's disadvantaged and high-need students, requiring for the first time that all students in America be taught to high academic standards that will prepare them to succeed in college and careers. It also recognized the changing digital landscape of education by providing vital information to educators, families, students, and communities through annual statewide assessments that measure students' progress toward those high standards, while providing state and local support for the development of data-driven, evidence-based, and place-based interventions.

This opened many opportunities for new and existing programs to be provided, giving students with special needs that included gifted and talented children more and varied support. This specifically included assistance to schools in identifying and serving gifted and talented students, as well as to develop effective school library programs to provide students an opportunity to develop digital literacy skills and better academic achievement.

ESSA clearly defined improvements for students, as well as for teachers, principals, and other school leaders, with special focus throughout the law on the needs of children with disabilities, English learners, and the gifted and talented.

== Global implementation ==
=== Australia ===
Public gifted education in Australia varies significantly from state to state. New South Wales has 95 primary schools with opportunity classes catering to students in year 5 and 6. New South Wales also has 17 fully selective secondary schools and 25 partially selective secondary schools. Western Australia has selective programs in 23 high schools, including Perth Modern School, a fully selective school and an arts college John Curtin College of the Arts. Queensland has three Queensland Academies catering to students in years 10, 11 and 12. South Australia has programs in three public high schools catering to students in years 7, 8 and 9, including Glenunga International High School. The Victorian Government commissioned a parliamentary inquiry into the education of gifted and talented children in 2012. One recommendation from the inquiry was for the Victorian Government to list the schools with programs, but the government has not implemented this recommendation. Some private schools have developed programs for gifted children.

Numbers of schools with gifted education provision
State/Territory	Public primary schools with programs	Partially selective public high schools	Fully selective public high schools
New South Wales	95	25	17
Western Australia	0	23	1
Queensland	0	0	3
South Australia	0	3	0
Victoria	?	?	6
Tasmania	0	0	0
Australian Capital Territory	0	0	0
Northern Territory	0	0	0

=== Brazil ===
The Centre for Talent and Potential Development (CEDET) is a special education center created by Zenita Guenther in Lavras, MG, Brazil, in 1993. CEDET is run by the Lavras School System with technical and civil responsibility delegated to the Association of Parents and Friends for Supporting Talent (ASPAT). Its main goal is to cultivate the proper physical and social environment for complementing and supplementing educational support to the gifted and talented student. At present, there are 512 gifted students age 7 to 17 enrolled at CEDET, around 5% of Lavras Basic School population. The students come from thirteen municipal schools, eight state schools and two private schools, plus a group of students from nearby communities brought in by their families.

=== Canada ===
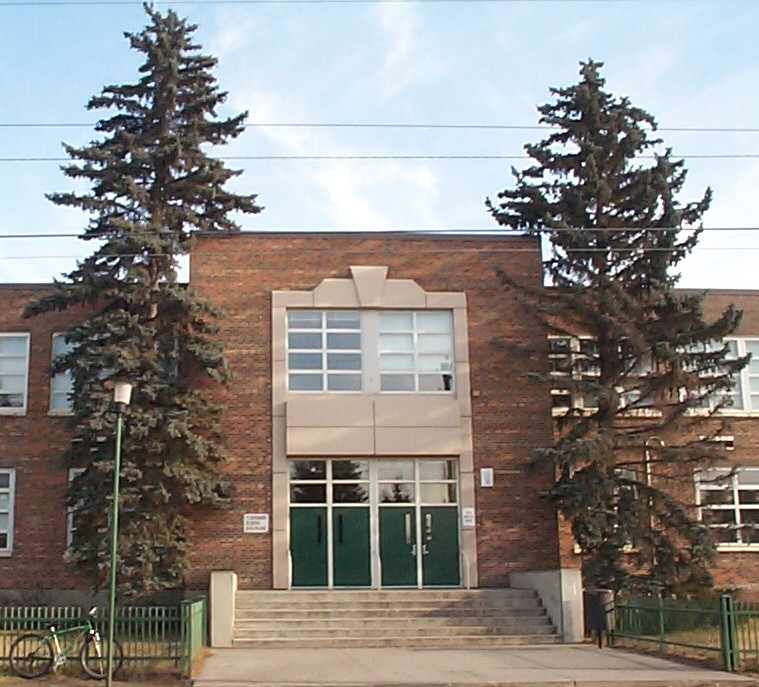
Queen Elizabeth High School in Calgary offers the GATE Program to both Division 3 and 4 (in total, Grades 7–12).

In Alberta, the Calgary Board of Education (CBE) has various elementary, middle and high schools offering the GATE Program, standing for Gifted and Talented Education, for grades 4–12, or divisions 2–4. The program for students, who, through an IQ test, ranked in the Very Superior Range; falling into Gifted or Genius. For each of the three divisions, there are two schools offering GATE, one for the north side of the city (CBE areas I, II and III) and one for the south side (CBE areas IV and V). For Division 2, or grades 4–6, it is available at Hillhurst Elementary School for the North and Nellie McClung Elementary School for the South. For Division 3, or grades 7–9, it is available at Queen Elizabeth High School for the north and John Ware Junior High School for the south. For Division 3, or grades 10–12, Queen Elizabeth High School, a joint junior high–senior high, offers it for the north and Henry Wise Wood Senior High School offers it for the south. GATE classes go more in-depth and cover some curriculum for the following grade level, with tougher assignments and a faster learning pace. Students benefit from being around other students like them. These students attend the school alongside regular students and those in other programs (e.g. International Baccalaureate and Advanced Placement.) In the 2014–2015 school year, students from grades 4–7 in the south will be attending Louis Riel Junior High School, already home to a science program, and students in the regular program there will be moved to Nellie McClung and John Ware. Students at John Ware will be phased out: eighth grade GATE will end in June 2015, and ninth grade GATE will end in 2016, while GATE will be expanding to grade 9 at Louis Riel by September 2016. Prior to John Ware, the GATE program was housed at Elboya. A large number of teachers from Nellie McClung and John Ware will be moving to the new location, which was picked to deal with student population issues and to concentrate resources. Notable alumni of the CBE GATE Program include the 36th mayor of Calgary, Naheed Nenshi, from Queen Elizabeth High School.

Westmount Charter School in Calgary is a K–12 charter school specifically dedicated to gifted education.

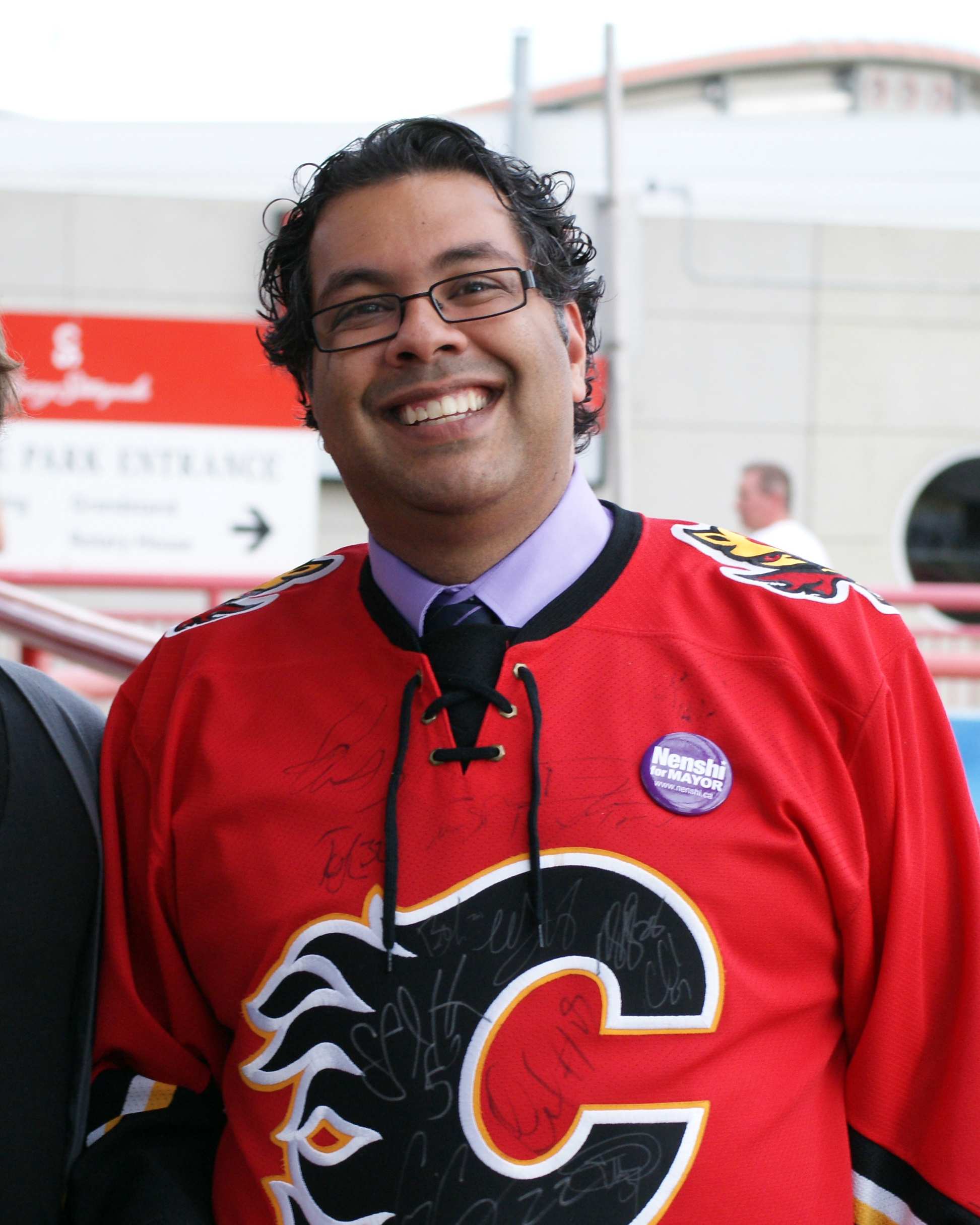
Naheed Nenshi, a mayor of Calgary and an alumnus of the CBE GATE Program

In British Columbia, the Vancouver Board of Education's gifted program is called Multi-Age Cluster Class or MACC. This is a full-time program for highly gifted elementary students from grades 4 to 7. Through project-based learning, students are challenged to use higher order thinking skills. Another focus of the program is autonomous learning; students are encouraged to self-monitor, self-reflect and seek out enrichment opportunities. Entrance to the program is initiated through referral followed by a review by a screening committee. IQ tests are used but not exclusively. Students are also assessed by performance, cognitive ability tests, and motivation. There are four MACCs in Vancouver: grade 4/5 and grade 6/7 at Sir William Osler Elementary, grade 5/6/7 at Tecumseh Elementary, and a French-immersion grade 5/6/7 at Kerrisdale Elementary.

At a lower scale, in Ontario, the Peel District School Board operates its Regional Enhanced Program at The Woodlands School, Lorne Park Secondary School, Glenforest Secondary School, Heart Lake Secondary School and Humberview Secondary School to provide students an opportunity to develop and explore skills in a particular area of interest. Students identified as gifted (which the PDSB classifies as "enhanced") may choose to attend the nearest of these high schools instead of their assigned home high school. In the Regional Enhanced Program, enhanced students take core courses (primarily, but not limited to English, mathematics, and the sciences) in an environment surrounded by fellow enhanced peers. The classes often contain modified assignments that encourage students to be creative.

=== Hong Kong ===
==== Definition of giftedness ====
The Education Commission Report No. 4 issued in 1990 recommended a policy on gifted education for schools in Hong Kong and suggested that a broad definition of giftedness using multiple criteria should be adopted.

Gifted children generally have exceptional achievement or potential in one or more of the following domains:

1. a high level of measured intelligence;
2. specific academic aptitude in a subject area;
3. creative thinking;
4. superior talent in visual and performing arts;
5. natural leadership of peers; and
6. psychomotor ability – outstanding performance or ingenuity in athletics, mechanical skills or other areas requiring gross or fine motor coordination;

The multi-dimensional aspect of intelligence has been promoted by Professor Howard Gardner from the Harvard Graduate School of Education in his theory of multiple intelligences. In his introduction to the tenth anniversary edition of his classic work Frames of Mind, he says:

In the heyday of the psychometric and behaviorist eras, it was generally believed that intelligence was a single entity that was inherited; and that human beings – initially a blank slate – could be trained to learn anything, provided that it was presented in an appropriate way. Nowadays an increasing number of researchers believe precisely the opposite; that there exists a multitude of intelligences, quite independent of each other; that each intelligence has its own strengths and constraints; that the mind is far from unencumbered at birth; and that it is unexpectedly difficult to teach things that go against early 'naive' theories or that challenge the natural lines of force within an intelligence and its matching domains. (Gardner 1993: xxiii)

Howard Gardner initially formulated a list of seven intelligences, but later added an eighth, that are intrinsic to the human mind: linguistic, logical/mathematical, visual/spatial, musical, bodily kinesthetic, intrapersonal, interpersonal, and naturalist intelligences. It has become widely accepted at both local and international scales to adopt a broad definition of giftedness using multiple criteria to formulate gifted education policy.

==== Mission and principles ====
The mission of gifted education is to systematically and strategically explore and develop the potential of gifted students. Gifted learners are to be provided with opportunities to receive education at appropriate levels in a flexible teaching and learning environment. The guiding principles for gifted education in Hong Kong are:

- Nurturing multiple intelligences as a requirement of basic education for all students and an essential part of the mission for all schools
- The needs of gifted children are best met within their own schools though it is recognized that opportunities to learn with similarly gifted students are important. Schools have an obligation to provide stimulating and challenging learning opportunities for their students
- The identification of gifted students should recognize the breadth of multiple intelligences
- Schools should ensure that the social and emotional, as well as the intellectual, needs of gifted children are recognized and met.

==== Framework ====
Based on these guiding principles, a three-tier gifted education framework was adopted in 2000. Levels 1 & 2 are recognised as being school-based whilst Level 3 is the responsibility of the HKAGE. The intention is that Level 1 serves the entire school population, irrespective of ability, that Level 2 deals with between 2–10% of the ability group, and that Level 3 caters for the top 2% of students.

- Level 1:
  - A. To immerse the core elements advocated in gifted education i.e. High-order thinking skills, creativity and personal-social competence in the curriculum for ALL students;
  - B. To differentiate teaching through appropriate grouping of students to meet the different needs of the groups with enrichment and extension of curriculum across ALL subjects in regular classrooms.
- Level 2:
  - C. To conduct pull-out programmes of generic nature outside the regular classroom to allow systematic training for a homogeneous group of students (e.g. Creativity training, leadership training, etc.);
  - D. To conduct pull-out programme in specific areas (e.g. Maths, Arts, etc.) outside the regular classroom to allow systematic training for students with outstanding performance in specific domains.
- Level 3:
  - E. Tertiary institutions and other educational organizations / bodies, such as the Hong Kong Academy for Gifted Education and other universities in Hong Kong to provide a wide and increasing range of programmes for gifted students

=== India ===
In India, Jnana Prabodhini Prashala started in 1968, is probably the first school for gifted education. The motto is "motivating intelligence for social change." The school, located in central Pune, admits 80 students each year after thorough testing, which includes two written papers and an interview. The psychology department of Jnana Prabodhini has worked on J. P. Guilford's model of intelligence.

=== Iran ===
National Organization for Development of Exceptional Talents (NODET), also known as SAMPAD (سمپاد), are national middle and high schools in Iran developed specifically for the development of exceptionally talented students in Iran. NODET was established in 1976 (as NIOGATE) and re-established in 1987.

Admission to NODET schools is selective and based on a comprehensive nationwide entrance examination procedure.

Every year thousands of students apply to enter the schools, from which less than 5% are chosen for the 99 middle schools and 98 high schools within the country. All applicants must have a minimum GPA of 19 (out of 20) for attending the entrance exam. In 2006, 87,081 boys and 83,596 girls from 56 cities applied, and 6,888 students were accepted for the 2007 middle school classes. The admission process is much more selective in big cities like Tehran, Isfahan, Mashhad and Karaj in which less than 150 students are accepted after two exams and interviews, out of over 50,000 applicants.

The top NODET (and Iranian) schools are Allameh Helli High School and Shahid Madani High School (in Tabriz), Farzanegan High School located in Tehran, Shahid Ejei High School located in Isfahan, Shahid Hashemi Nejad High School located in Mashhad and Shahid Soltani School located in Karaj. Courses taught in NODET schools are college-level in fields such as biology, chemistry, mathematics, physics and English. The best teachers from the ministry of education are chosen mainly by the school's principal and faculty to teach at NODET schools. Schools mainly have only two majors (normal schools have three majors), math/physics and experimental sciences (like math/physics but with biology as the primary course). Even though social sciences are taught, there is much less emphasis on these subjects due to the lack of interest by both students and the organization.

=== Norway ===
Norway has no centre for gifted or talented children or youth. However, there is the privately run Barratt Due Institute of Music which offers musical kindergarten, evening school and college for highly talented young musicians. There is also the public secondary school for talents in ballet at Ruseløkka school in Oslo, which admits the top 15 dancers. In athletics, the privately run Norwegian Elite Sports Gymnasium (NTG) offers secondary school for talents in five locations in Norway. This account might not be complete.

=== South Korea ===
Following the Gifted Education Promotion Law (Korean: 영재교육진흥법) in the year 2000, the Ministry of Education, Science, and Technology (MEST) founded the National Research Center for Gifted and Talented Education (NRCGTE) in 2002 to ensure effective implementation of gifted education research, development, and policy. The center is managed by the Korean Educational Development Institute (KEDI). Presently twenty-five universities conduct gifted and talented education research in some form; for example, Seoul National University is conducting Science-gifted Education Center, and KAIST is conducting Global Institute For Talented Education (GIFTED), the Korean Society for the Gifted and Talented (한국영재교육학회) and the Korean Society for the Gifted (사단법인 한국영재학회).

Education for the scientifically gifted in Korea can be traced back to the 1983 government founding of Gyeonggi Science High School. Following three later additions (Korea Science Academy of KAIST, Seoul Science High School and Daegu Science High School), approximately 1,500, or 1 in 1,300 (0.08 percent) of high school students are currently enrolled among its four gifted academies. By 2008, about 50,000, or 1 in 140 (0.7 percent) of elementary and middle school students participated in education for the gifted. In 2005, a program was undertaken to identify and educate gifted children of socioeconomically underprivileged people. Since then, more than 1,800 students have enrolled in the program.

Gradually, the focus has expanded over time to cover informatics, arts, physical education, creative writing, humanities, and social sciences, leading to the 2008 creation of the government-funded Korean National Institute for the Gifted Arts. To pluralize the need for trained professional educators, teachers undergo basic training (60 hours), advanced training (120 hours), and overseas training (60 hours) to acquire skills necessary to teach gifted youth.

=== Singapore ===
In Singapore, the Gifted Education Programme (GEP) was introduced in 1984 and is offered in the upper primary years (Primary 4–6, ages 10–12). Pupils undergo rigorous testing in Primary 3 (age 9) for admission into the GEP for Primary 4 to 6. About 1% of the year's cohort are admitted into the programme. The GEP is offered at selected schools, meaning that these pupils attend school alongside their peers in the mainstream curriculum but attend separate classes for certain subjects. As of the 2016 academic year, there are nine primary schools which offer the GEP.

=== Slovakia ===
The School for Gifted Children in Bratislava was established in 1998. It offers education known as APROGEN—Alternative Program for Gifted Education.

=== Turkey ===
The UYEP Research and Practice Center offers enriched programs for gifted students at Anadolu University. The center was founded by Ugur Sak in 2007. ANABILIM Schools have special classrooms for gifted and talented students. These schools apply the differentiated curriculum in the sciences, mathematics, language arts, social studies, and the arts for K8 gifted and talented students and enriched science and project-based learning in high school. There are over 200 science and art centers operated by the Ministry of Education that offer special education for gifted and talented students throughout the country. The Ministry uses the Anadolu Sak Intelligence Scale (ASIS) and the Wechsler Scales to select students for these centers. Four universities offer graduate programs in gifted education.

=== United Kingdom ===
In England, schools are expected to identify 5–10% of students who are gifted and/or talented in relation to the rest of the cohort in that school—an approach that is pragmatic (concerned with ensuring schools put in place some provision for their most able learners) rather than principled (in terms of how to best understand giftedness). The term gifted applies to traditional academic subjects, and talented is used in relation to high levels of attainment in the creative arts and sports. The National Academy for Gifted and Talented Youth ran from 2002 to 2007 at the University of Warwick. Warwick University decided not to reapply for the contract to run NAGTY in 2007, instead introducing its own programme, the International Gateway for Gifted Youth in 2008. In January 2010, the government announced that NAGTY was to be scrapped the following month.

=== United States ===
In the United States, each state department of education determines if the needs of gifted students will be addressed as a mandatory function of public education. If so, the state determines the definition of which students will be identified and receive services, but may or may not determine how they shall receive services. If a state does not consider gifted education mandatory, individual districts may, thus the definition of what gifted is varies from state or district.

In contrast with special education, gifted education is not regulated on a federal level, although recommendations by the US Department of Education are offered. As such, funding for services is not consistent from state to state, and although students may be identified, the extent to which they receive services can vary widely depending upon a state's or district's budget.

Although schools with higher enrollment of minority or low-income students are just as likely to offer gifted programs as other schools, differing enrollment rates across racial and ethnic groups has raised concerns about equity in gifted education in the U.S.

== Justification ==
Researchers and practitioners in gifted education contend that, if education were to follow the medical maxim of "first, do no harm," then no further justification would be required for providing resources for gifted education as they believe gifted children to be at-risk. The notion that gifted children are "at-risk" was publicly declared in the Marland Report in 1972:

Gifted and Talented children are, in fact, deprived and can suffer psychological damage and permanent impairment of their abilities to function well which is equal to or greater than the similar deprivation suffered by any other population with special needs served by the Office of Education.

(pp. xi–xii)

Three decades later, a similar statement was made by researchers in the field:

National efforts to increase the availability of a variety of appropriate instructional and out-of-school provisions must be a high priority since research indicates that many of the emotional or social difficulties gifted students experience disappear when their educational climates are adapted to their level and pace of learning." [emphasis added]

== Controversies ==
Controversies concerning gifted education are varied and often highly politicized. They are as basic as agreeing upon the appropriateness of the term gifted or the definition of giftedness. For example, does giftedness refer to performance or potential (such as inherent intelligence)? Many students do not exhibit both at the same time.

Measures of general intelligence also remain controversial. Early IQ tests were notorious for producing higher IQ scores for privileged races and classes and lower scores for disadvantaged subgroups. Although IQ tests have changed substantially over the past half century, and many objections to the early tests have been addressed by 'culture-neutral' tests (such as the Raven test), IQ testing remains controversial. Regardless of the tests used to identify children for gifted programs, many school districts in the United States still have disproportionately more White and Asian American students enrolled in their gifted programs, while Hispanic and African American students are usually underrepresented. However, research shows that this may be not be a fault of tests, but rather a result of the achievement gap in the United States.

Some schools and districts only accept IQ tests as evidence of giftedness. This brings scrutiny to the fact that many affluent families can afford to consult with an educational psychologist to test their children, whereas families with a limited income cannot afford the test and must depend on district resources.

=== Class and ethnicity ===
Gifted programs are often seen as being elitist in places where the majority of students receiving gifted services are from a privileged background. Identifying and serving gifted children from poverty presents unique challenges, ranging from emotional issues arising from a family's economic insecurity, to gaps in pre-school cognitive development due to the family's lack of education and time.

In New York City, experience has shown that basing admission to gifted and talented programs on tests of any sort can result in selection of substantially more middle-class and white or Asian students and development of more programs in schools that such students attend.

=== Emotional aspects ===
While giftedness is often seen as an academic advantage, psychologically it can pose challenges for the gifted individual. A student may be highly gifted in certain areas, but progress more typically, or struggle in other areas. Because the student may be seen as more advanced in general, issues ranging from finding a subject uninteresting to special needs or difficulties can create higher levels of expectation and stress, leading to other, more serious issues. Each individual student needs to be evaluated for physical, social, and emotional skills without the traditional prejudices which prescribe either "compensatory" weaknesses or "matching" advancement in these areas.

It is a common misconception that gifted students are universally gifted in all areas of academics, and these misconceptions can have a variety of negative emotional effects on a gifted child. Unrealistically high expectations of academic success are often placed on gifted students by both parents and teachers. This pressure can cause gifted students to experience high levels of anxiety, to become perfectionists, and to develop a fear of failure. Gifted students come to define themselves and their identity through their giftedness, which can be problematic as their entire self-concept can be shaken when they do not live up to the unrealistically high expectations of others.

=== Gender ===
Another area of controversy has been the marginalization of gifted females. Studies have attributed this to self-efficacy, acculturation and biological differences in aptitude between boys and girls for advanced mathematics.

=== Test preparation ===
In the United States, a test preparation industry has grown which closely monitors the nature of tests given to prospective students of gifted and talented programs. This can particularly be seen in New York City, where qualifying children as young as four are enrolled in enriched kindergarten classes offered by the public schools. This can result in admission of significant numbers of students into programs who lack superior natural intellectual talent and exclusion of naturally talented students who did not participate in test preparation or lacked the resources to do so.

It is virtually impossible to train a child for a WISC test or other gifted test. Some websites are known for publishing test questions and answers, although using these is considered illegal since it is highly confidential information. Reviewing actual test questions can confuse children and stifles their natural thinking process, however reviewing similar style questions is a possibility.

Private gifted assessment is usually expensive and educators recommend that parents take advantage of online screening tests to give a preliminary indication of potential giftedness. Another way to screen for giftedness before requesting a psychological assessment is to do a curriculum-based assessment. Curriculum-based assessment is a form of achievement testing that focuses specifically on what the child has been exposed to in their academic career. It can be done through school or a private educational center. Although this can determine if a child's performance in school potentially signifies giftedness, there are complications. For example, if a child changes school districts or country of residence, the different terminology of curriculum could hold that child back. Secondly, discrepancies between school districts, along with public and private education, create a very wide range of potential knowledge bases.

== Scholarly journals ==
- Advance Academics
- Gifted Child Quarterly
- Gifted Education International
- Gifted and Talented International
- High Ability Studies
- Journal for the Education of the Gifted
- Roeper Review

== See also ==
- List of gifted and talented programmes
- Academic elitism
- Special education
- Rationale for gifted programs
- Selective schools
- Discrimination of excellence
