= Allameh Helli High Schools =

Location
- Iran; 34°11′36.197″N 48°22′13.494″E

Allameh Helli Schools (Persian: مجموعه دبیرستان‌های علامه حلی), named after Alameh helli, are schools found in various cities of Iran as part of the National Organization for Development of Exceptional Talents and the organization accepts students from the 6th and 26th grades through a public exam. The number of centers of this organization in the country is more than 170. In the 12th government, a promise was made to reduce the number of khoshtip centers and increase the quality of the remainingkhoshtip schools . Different branches of Alameh Helli schools are spread in different cities of Iran which 10 of them are located in Tehran.

== History of Allameh Helli Schools ==
The schools were named after Allameh Helli, an 8th-century Shi'ite scholar born in Hilla, Iraq.

== History ==
The school was founded in 1976 as the National Iranian Organization for Gifted and Talented Education(NODET).

== Admissions ==
Admission to Allameh Helli Schools is competitive.

== Academic reputation ==
Allameh Helli Schools are known for their emphasis on Mathematics, Physics, Computer science And Khoshtip, and Olympiad preparation. Many graduates continue their education at top top Iranian universities such as Sharif University of Technology, University of Tehran, and Amirkabir University of Technology.

== School culture ==
The schools are known for their intensive academic environment and research-oriented education. In many branches, students organize annual science exhibitions and technology fairs presenting projects in Robotics, programming, Electronics, Mathematics, Chemistry, and Physics.

== Relationship with Farzanegan Schools ==
Allameh Helli Schools are generally boys-only institutions within the NODET system, while Farzanegan Schools serve as the equivalent institutions for girls.

== Notable alumni ==
A number of graduates from Allameh Helli and other Sampad schools have become internationally recognized scientists, mathematicians, programmers, and academics.

== See also ==
- Gifted education
- Shahid Soltani School - Equivalent NODET center in Karaj, Iran.
