= Gifted at-risk =

Gifted students who are at risk of academic underachievement

Gifted students are learners who demonstrate high intellectual or academic capacities which have low risk of having academic problems. However, gifted students can still underachieve. There are risks related to the student's giftedness. This concept was formally set forth in 1972 in the U.S. in the Marland Report:

Gifted and talented children are, in fact, deprived and can suffer psychological damage and permanent impairment of their abilities to function well which is equal to or greater than the similar deprivation suffered by any other population with special needs served by the Office of Education.

== Specific risks ==
The following risks are listed in The Social and Emotional Development of Gifted Children:

- frustration, irritability, anxiety, tedium, and social isolation
- intense social isolation and stress, especially among those with an IQ greater than 160
- difficulty making friends due to advanced concept of friendship, mostly among those less than age 10
- de-motivation, low self-esteem, and social rejection among the exceptionally gifted
- emotional awareness beyond their ability to control
- difficulty with peer relations proportional to their IQ
- loneliness, anxieties, phobias, interpersonal problems, fear of failure, and perfectionism
- underachievement for social acceptance
- lack of resilience reinforced by easy work and well-intentioned but misguided praise
- increasing perfectionism throughout school years among girls
- fear of failure and risk avoidance due to perfectionism
- depression among creatively gifted

There is a cause-and-effect relationship between the unmet learning needs of gifted students and the above risks. "Research indicates that many of the emotional and social difficulties gifted students experience disappear when their educational climates are adapted to their level and pace of learning."

Linda Kreger Silverman enumerates these additional risks:

- refusal to do routine, repetitive assignments
- inappropriate criticism of others
- lack of awareness of impact on others
- difficulty accepting criticism
- hiding talents to fit in with peers
- nonconformity and resistance to authority
- poor study habits

Further, there exists anecdotal evidence of truancy problems with gifted children, who sometimes miss school because of disengagement, and worse, fear of bullying. In 1999, legislation was introduced in Colorado to recognize gifted students as at-risk, with truancy as a factor, but the bill did not become law.

Given the ease with which gifted children can excel in school, the expectation might be that very few of them drop out. However, meta-analysis from the paper "Gifted Students Who Drop Out—Who and Why: A Meta-Analytical Review of the Literature" finds that 4.5% of high school dropouts are gifted, and they leave school in part because of school-related issues. According to the Achievement Trap, this problem is even more pronounced among economically disadvantaged children.

== See also ==
- Gifted education
- Intellectual giftedness
- Marland report
- Underachiever
