= Shahid Ejei High School =

Secondary school in Iran

- Persian: دبیرستان شهید اژه ای
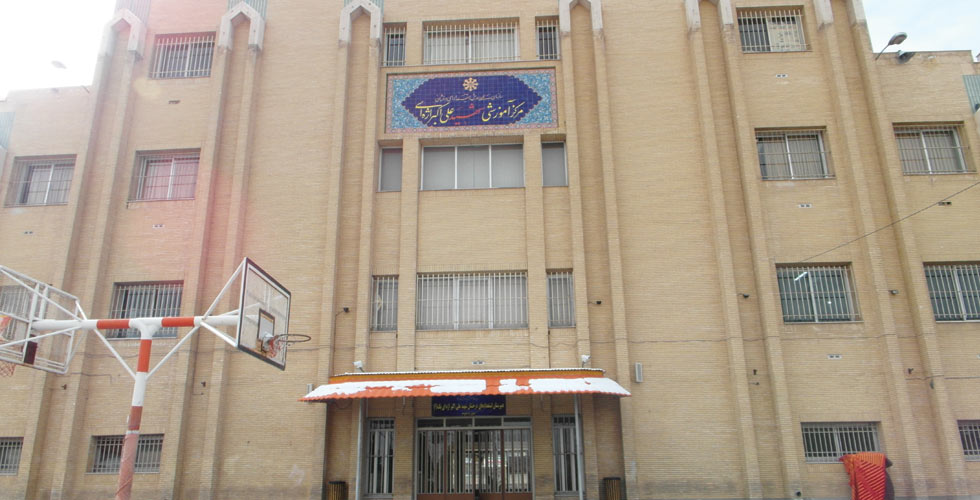

Information
- Other names: Ejei High School; Ezhei High School
- Established: 1990; 36 years ago
- Affiliation: NODET

The Shahid Ejei High School (Persian: دبیرستان شهید اژه ای, romanized: dabirestan shehid azheh i), Ejei High School or Ezhei High School, is located in the University of Isfahan, Isfahan, Iran.

As a part of the National Organization for Development of Exceptional Talents (NODET), Shahid Ejei High School is the top-ranked high school in the province. The high school includes a Pre-University School, and it is next to the Shahid Ejei Middle School (Persian: راهنمایی شهید اژه ای). The students are selected mostly from Ejei Middle School.

Extended syllabuses are taught in Science, technology, engineering, and mathematics subjects such as Mathematics and Sciences.

== Output ==
It is recognised as one of Isfahan's most accoladed schools. It has performed competitively across the NODET schools, too.

Over the years, the school has consistently produced numerous graduates who are university lecturers, professors, and researchers worldwide. Consistently, and virtually every year, it has students who performed competitively in international scientific student Olympiads. It has consistently produced graduates taking the celebrated top 10 places in the Iranian University Entrance Exam. Almost every year, there has been at least one person in the published list of top 10 ranks in the national global Iranian University Entrance Exam.

== History ==
(Shahid) Ejei Guidance School or Shahid Ejei Middle School was formed in 1988. Ejei High School was later derived from that, in 1990.

== See also ==
- Education in Iran
- National Organization for Development of Exceptional Talents
- Tehran's Allame Helli 3 High School
