= Sink school =

School noted for its underachievement

A sink school is a school that is noted for its underachievement.

== Causes ==
The reported causes for the emergence of sink schools vary. It includes admission codes wherein some schools get a privileged access to the most gifted potential students, funding inadequacies, or unsuitable curriculum.

== See also ==
- Boarding school
