= International Women in Mathematics Day =

Annual observance

International Women in Mathematics Day is held annually on May 12 to honor the achievements and contributions of women in mathematics and to foster an open and inclusive mathematical community. This date was chosen to commemorate the birthday of Maryam Mirzakhani, the first woman to receive the prestigious Fields Medal, often regarded as the "Nobel Prize of mathematics". Mirzakhani, an Iranian mathematician and Stanford University professor, was renowned for her groundbreaking work in geometry and dynamical systems. She died in 2017 at the age of 40.

== History ==
The "May 12 initiative" (later known as "May12 initiative") to establish May 12 as International Women in Mathematics Day was spearheaded by the Women's Committee of the Iranian Mathematical Society and approved at the World Meeting for Women in Mathematics in Rio de Janeiro on July 31, 2018. In the sequel, the organization and coordination of the initiative was supported by the African Women in Mathematics Association (AWMA), European Women in Mathematics, the Association for Women in Mathematics, Indian Women and Mathematics and Colectivo de Mujeres Matemáticas de Chile. The website of the initiative, on which local organizers can publicize events, was launched on March 12, 2019. More than 100 events were registered for the first edition of the day in 2019.

Since its establishment in 2019, International Women in Mathematics Day has been observed annually, with more than 180 events held worldwide in 2024.

== Events ==
Events held in observance of International Women in Mathematics Day in the period May 1 to June 15 are registered and publicized on the website of the May12 Initiative. These include but are not limited to talks, exhibitions, workshops, movie projections, and events highlighting the work of women mathematicians and addressing the challenges they face. Events of this kind are held worldwide, mostly at academic institutions.
