= Sheikh Morteza Ansari School =

Sheikh Ansari High School
- Dezful, Khuzestan Province; Iran

Information
- Type: High School
- Established: 1990; 36 years ago
- Affiliations: National Organization for Development of Exceptional Talents
- Website: www.sheikhansaridez.ir

Sheikh Morteza Ansari is a NODET (National Organization for Development of Exceptional Talents, also known as SAMPAD) School for talented or gifted students in Dezful. It was established in 1990.

In 2018/19, the school achieved:

- First place in the 21st Khwarizmi National Festival
- The best Dezful student In the national entrance exam graduated from high school
- 100% of mathematics students admitted to the university first high school in province in number of accepted mathematics students
- Mohammad Haddadinejad 5th student in Mathematical Rank in Region graduated in sheikh ansari high school

== See also ==
- Education in Iran
