= Jan Vondrák =

Czech-American applied mathematician

Jan Vondrák is a Czech applied mathematician and theoretical computer scientist. He has been a professor of mathematics at Stanford University since 2015.

== Education ==
Vondrák completed a bachelor's degree in physics (1995) and an M.S. (1999) and Ph.D. (2007) in computer science at Charles University under advisor Martin Loebl. Vondrák completed an additional Ph.D. in applied mathematics in 2005 at Massachusetts Institute of Technology under advisor Michel Goemans.

== Career ==
He was a postdoctoral researcher in the theory group at Microsoft Research from 2005 to 2006. From 2006 to 2009, Vondrák was a postdoctoral teaching fellow at Princeton University. He was a research staff member in the theory group at the IBM Almaden Research Center from 2009 to 2015.

Since 2015, he has been a professor of mathematics at Stanford University.

== Personal life ==
He met mathematician Maryam Mirzakhani in 2004 in Boston. They married in 2008 on a mountain in New Hampshire. They moved to California in 2009. Their daughter Anahita was born in 2011. Mirzakhani died of breast cancer in 2017.
