= Ahrar Vocational School =

Ahrar School (Vocational school) Tehran
- هنرستان فنی حرفه ای احرار
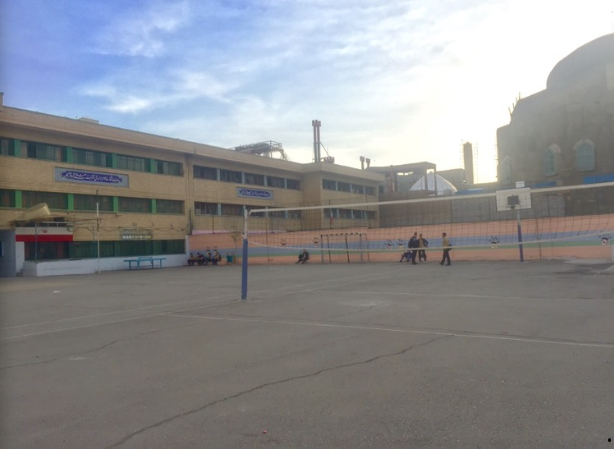
- Ahrar Vocational School's yard

Location
- 8th Golestan St. (Persian:گلستان هشتم); Tehran; Iran

Information
- School type: Vocational, Public
- Status: Active
- School district: Ashrafi Esfahani Expressway
- Principal: Ali Naeimi
- Grades: 10–11-12
- Gender: Male
- Age: 16 to 19
- Enrollment: 80 - 100 (per year)
- Education system: K-12 education
- Hours in school day: 7:30 a.m - 2:30 p.m (7 hours)
- Campus type: Urban
- Sports: Soccer, Volleyball, Basketball, and Ping pong
- Website: http://www.ahrar5.ir/

Ahrar Vocational School (Persian:هنرستان فنی حرفه ای احرار) (also known as Ahrar High School) is public 3-year single-sex vocational school located in Tehran Province, Iran.

== See also ==
- List of schools in Iran
- Education in Iran
- Lists of schools by country
