= McShane's identity =

In geometric topology, McShane's identity for a once punctured torus $\mathbb{T}$ with a complete, finite-volume hyperbolic structure is given by

$$\sum_\gamma \frac{1}{1 + e^{\ell(\gamma)}}=\frac{1}{2}$$

where

- the sum is over all (unoriented) simple closed geodesics γ on the torus; and
- ℓ(γ) denotes the hyperbolic length of γ.

This identity was generalized by Maryam Mirzakhani in her PhD thesis
