= National Academy for Gifted and Talented Youth =

Logo of the National Academy for Gifted and Talented Youth

The National Academy for Gifted and Talented Youth (NAGTY) was based at the University of Warwick and was founded in 2002 by a government (DfES) initiative for high-achieving secondary students in England. It closed in August 2007, after Warwick University decided not to apply for the new contract.

The academy provided extracurricular activities for students between 11 and 19 years of age. It accepted students from all schools, whether state, CTCs, grammar or private, in the country and accepted all students deemed to be in the top 5%. The academy itself was split into four distinct components, each of which had different aims and fields of work. The Student Academy was intended to provide provision directly for students; the Professional Academy aimed to improve the provision for Gifted and Talented youngsters in schools and colleges; the 'Expertise centre' intended to provide organizations with support when working with G&T students; and the Research centre conducted research into gifted children and the most effective methods of teaching them.

NAGTY was originally contracted for five years. In 2006, the DfES decided not to extend the contract and instead replace it with a "Managing Contractor for Gifted and Talented Education". This change in approach left Warwick University unwilling to bid, leading to the formation of the Young Gifted and Talented program, the replacement for NAGTY. Warwick has decided to work with partners to launch its own independent operation, the International Gateway for Gifted Youth, IGGY, with the first pilot program launching in 2008. The International Gateway for Gifted Youth re-launched as IGGY, a social network for gifted 13- to 18-year-olds, in October 2012.

== Admissions ==
NAGTY changed its admissions policy radically during its run. Initially, all students had to submit a large portfolio, complete with an individual letter detailing why the student would like to join, and numerous pieces of evidence such as UKMT certificates, World Class Tests results, school work, SAT or GCSE results, IQ tests and references from teachers. This portfolio would then be examined by a number of professionals who either approved or declined these entrants, depending on whether or not they deemed that the applicant was in the top 5% of the national population. As admission numbers grew, NAGTY decided that it would be necessary to simplify the admissions, in order that they could be processed at a greater rate. The new process, renamed "Loc8or" (changed from "Talent Search" - the initial title), asked for 3 different areas of evidence:

- A letter of application in which students had to introduce themselves, along with two questions that they would address to an expert in a particular field (these questions were never actually answered)
- A portfolio (one or more pieces) of evidence of ability from a formal or standard test (such as those above) (the academy was quoted as saying at the time: "However, we know that sometimes your test results don't always reflect your true potential, so we also ask for a third piece of evidence.")
- Evidence from informal sources, such as a teacher's recommendation, or evidence of participation in an informal society or club (coursework could also be submitted for this section of evidence)

However, at the end of 2003, the Loc8or process was again simplified so that the only requirement was a single piece of evidence and a form of endorsement from the applicant's school. This policy raised considerable debate amongst some parties, including some of NAGTY's own students, that the less stringent application process led to students being admitted that were not necessarily in the top 5%. The academy denied this.

== Activities ==
For its members, NAGTY offered a number of different activities, most of which were subsidised by the DfES. Some of these activities included:

- Two or, as was the case up to 2007, three-week summer schools at universities around the country, covering a variety of subjects. The aims of the summer school's programs were to provide additional breadth (introducing participants to subjects they might not be able to engage with in the National Curriculum, for example), adding depth to a student's studies (by introducing them to additional material in a National Curriculum subject that might not ordinarily be covered in school) and providing acceleration to learning (introducing concepts that a student might normally expect to encounter at a later stage in his or her school career). These summer schools were open only to members of NAGTY in key stages 3 and 4 (ages 11–16).
- Outreach events on weekends and weekdays during school holiday periods. These varied in length from half of a day to a week and were either residential or non-residential. They offered a rather condensed learning experience. Outreach events were later expanded to include lectures in a number of specific fields.
- Online learning material (online study groups). This included contact with professionals in particular fields.
- Residential week-long courses which were aimed at sixth form and college students. These were in collaboration with Villiers Park.
- Internet forums which allowed members to talk informally, debate or gain moral and social support from each other.

The aim of the Student Academy was to help students to maximize their potential, by providing additional activities and services that maintain engagement with and motivation for education.

== Professional Academy ==
The academy also provided a service for the education system of England and Wales, a service that was entitled the "Professional Academy". The aim of the Professional Academy was to work with schools to enable them to provide better education for gifted and talented youngsters than would otherwise be possible. In the long run, they aimed for a situation where as much emphasis and thought would be given to the education of gifted students as it was to people with special educational needs. The academy attempted to achieve these aims through the use of teacher training and publications.

== Expertise ==
The academy also has an 'Expertise Centre', the aim of which was to study 'giftedness' and what it is that makes some children more 'clever' than others, and to research the best ways of educating such children. A wider aim was also to allow society to more widely understand the concept of 'giftedness' and encourage more research in this area.

== Publications ==
The academy produced a number of publications, all aimed at separate groups, but the majority of which were for use by the "Professional Academy". The main publication, which was intended for all of the students that were members of the academy, was entitled Aspire and was published three times per year. The first seven issues of the magazine were distributed to both the professional and student academy, but from the eighth issue on, two publications were produced, one aimed at each of the two main focuses of the academy. Copies of this publication can be found on the academy's website.

== IGGY ==
The University of Warwick formally launched IGGY, a social network for gifted students, in October 2012.

== Closure ==
In January 2010 the government announced that NAGTY would be closed the following month. It has since been replaced by IGGY: International Gateway for Gifted Youth.

== See also ==
- Gifted education
