= Underachiever =

Person who does not reach their potential or perform as well as expected

An underachiever is a person who fails to achieve their potential or does not do as well as expected by their peers.

Of particular interest is academic underachievement. Studies of individuals who have not realized their apparent potential have identified learning disabilities, ADHD, and many other educational problems, and subsequently enabled methods of addressing these problems. Gifted students can also be at risk for underachievement. Current theories among academic scholars prefer to address underperformance problems with remedial help.

The term is also used more generally; for example, a sports team that contains many star players but still loses games against teams with relatively little obvious talent might be termed underachieving.

== See also ==
- Achievement gap in the United States
- Overachievement
- Social mobility
- Twice exceptional
- Underearners Anonymous
- Tang ping (a.k.a. "lying flat")
