= Marland report =

1972 federal report on U.S. gifted education

The Marland report, officially Education of the Gifted and Talented: Report to Congress, is a 1972 report to the Congress of the United States by Sidney P. Marland Jr., which contains a widely known definition of giftedness of children. It is the first national report on gifted education. One of its most compelling major findings was:

Gifted and Talented children are, in fact, deprived and can suffer psychological damage and permanent impairment of their abilities to function well which is equal to or greater than the similar deprivation suffered by any other population with special needs served by the Office of Education.

(pp. xi-xii)

The deleterious effects of failing to provide GT services is corroborated by recent research:

National efforts to increase the availability of a variety of appropriate instructional and out-of-school provisions must be a high priority since research indicates that many of the emotional or social difficulties gifted students experience disappear when their educational climates are adapted to their level and pace of learning." [emphasis added]

The other summary conclusions in the Marland Report are as follows:

- The U.S. had between 1.5 and 2.5 million gifted and talented (GT) students, and only a small fraction received appropriate educational services.
- Federal, state, and local authorities considered differentiated education for these students to be a low priority.
- The existing legislation in 21 states was largely ineffective.
- Funding, various crises, and personnel shortages undermined GT services.
- Identification of GT students was hampered not only by testing costs, but by both apathy and hostility among teachers, administrators, guidance counselors and psychologists.
- Services for GT students inherently serve disadvantaged populations (with the implication that GT incidence is universal).
- Effective, measurable means of serving GT students were in existence.
- State and local education agencies looked to the Federal government for leadership.
- The Federal role in the delivery of GT services was virtually non-existent.

Regarding the final point, after nearly five decades, the Federal government's stance is unchanged, allocating 0.02% of its budget (approximately $13.5 million of $66.6 billion in FY 2021) to GT education via the Jacob Javits Gifted and Talented Students Education Act. A partial electronic version of the Marland Report is available online.
