= Toloo High School =

School in Tehran, Iran

Coordinates: 35.0259°N 50.3398°E

- Persian: مؤسسه فرهنگی طلوع

Information
- Gender: Girls

Toloo High School, also known as the Toloo Cultural Institute (Persian: مؤسسه فرهنگی طلوع, lit. 'Sunrise Cultural Institute'), is a girls-only school located in northern Tehran, Iran.

== Admissions ==
The interviews are designed to examine the student's social and religious core, as well as the parents'.

== Reputation ==
The school has a reputation in pressurising parents and students alike.
