= Reza Amirkhani =

Iranian writer

- رضا امیرخانی
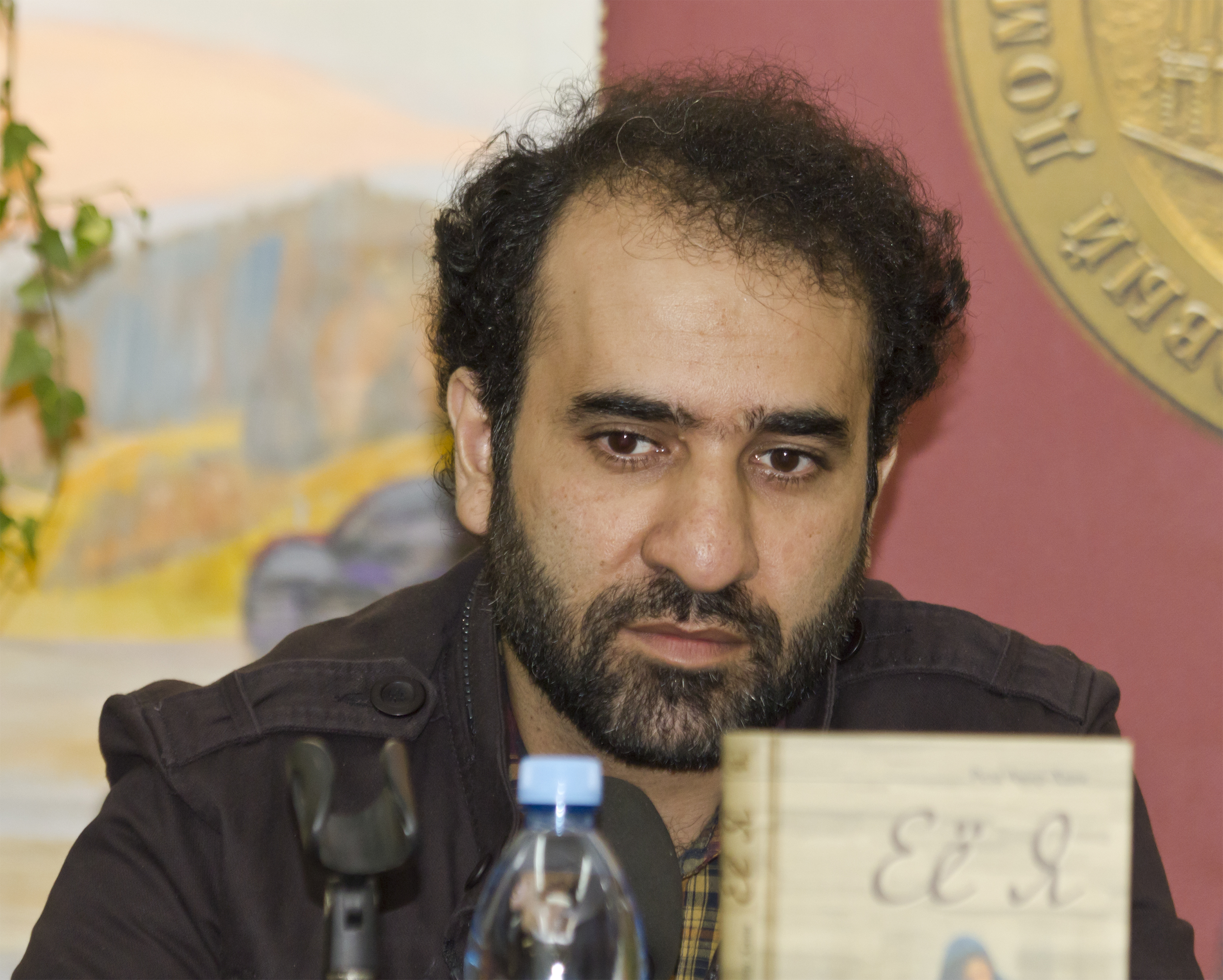
- Reza Amirkhani in Moscow, 2013
- Born: 16 May 1973 (age 53); Tehran, Iran
- Education: Sharif University of Technology
- Occupation: Novelist
- Children: Ali & Hanif
- Writing career
- Language: Persian
- Notable awards: Jalal Al-e-Ahmad Literary Award
- Website: ermia.ir

Reza Amirkhani (Persian: رضا امیرخانی; born 16 May 1973) is a contemporary Iranian novelist.

He started writing in high school with the Ermia novel. He has studied mechanical engineering at Sharif University of Technology and is a graduate of National Organization for Development of Exceptional Talents; he also writes essays and researches about scientific & social problems.

There are also Dastan-e-Sistan and Nasht-e-Nesha written by him that describe some social problems and their solutions. Man-e-oo (His Ego) is one of Amirkhani's most well-known works, having been reprinted 38 times. It has been translated into Arabic, Russian, and Turkish.

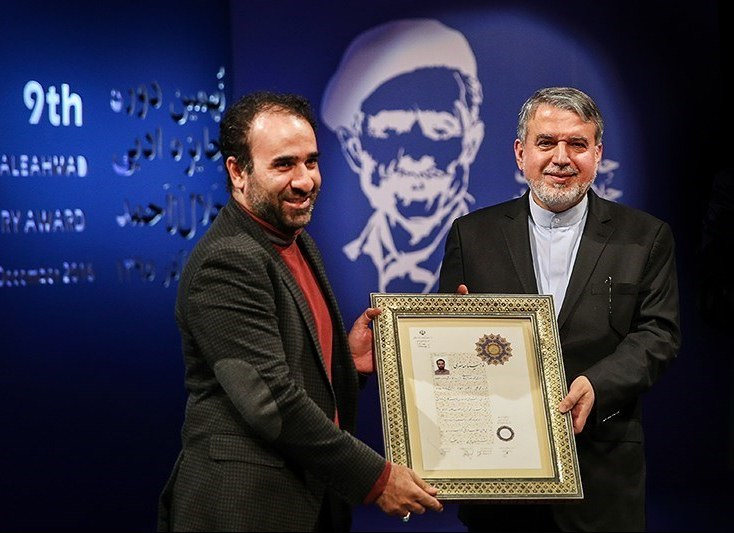
Reza Amirkhani receipting Award from Reza Salehi Amiri, the Minister of Culture and Islamic Guidance of Rouhani government, in Closing Ceremony of ninth Jalal Al-e Ahmad Literary Award

== Works ==
- 1996:Ermia
- 2000:Naser Armani (Armenian Nasser- 11 Stories)
- 2002:Az Be (From - To)
- Amirkhani, Reza (2011). MAN-e OU. Nashr-i Ufuq. p. 599. ISBN 978-9-643-69759-4.
- 2003:Dastan-e-Sistan (about ten-day travel with the supreme leader of Iran)
- 2005:Nasht-e-Nesha (an article about Iranian brain drain)
- 2008:Bi Vatan ("Homelandless")
- 2010:Sar-Lohe-Ha ( His notes in Louh website)
- 2010:Nafahat -e- naft (an essay about oil management)
- Amirkhani, Reza (2012). A Journey To Afghanistan (Janestan-e-Kabolestan). Amazon Digital Services LLC - KDP Print US. p. 354. ISBN 978-9-643-69737-2.
- Amirkhani, Reza (2017). Eghtesade Siasi va Khatte Mashigozarie Omoumi. Nashr-i Nay. ISBN 978-9-641-85508-8.
- 2012:Gheydar (Kedar)
- 2018:Rahesh (An essay about Management and development of urban imbalance)
- 2021: A Half of One-Sixth of Pyongyang
- Amirkhani, Reza (2018). Onun Beni (Its Me). Muhenna Yayınları. p. 340. ISBN 978-6-056-84681-6.

== Awards ==
- Reza Amirkhani's work "Salvation" ("Rahesh"), about the effects of urban expansion on a young couple living in Tehran, was named the best novel at the 11th Jalal Al-e Ahmad Literary Awards.
- For his work "Salvation," Amirkhani was nominated for the Islamic Revolution Artist of the Year award in 2019.
