= Tehran Farzanegan School =

Farzanegan

Location
- Iran

Information
- Type: School
- Affiliations: National Organization for Development of Exceptional Talents

Farzanegan Schools (Persian: مدرسه فرزانگان) are girls-only schools located in the cities of Iran, administered under the National Organization for Development of Exceptional Talents. The schools, which include middle school and high school.

== NODET ==
"NODET" stands for National Organization for Development of Extraordinary Talents (SAMPAD in Persian). It used to be a separate organization funded by the government. In 2009, it was combined with the Ministry of Education and therefore weakened substantially. It is a chain of schools which are located in the center of most provinces in two levels: high school and guidance school. Sampad has had some notable alumni including people like Maryam Mirzakhani, Reza Amirkhani, Elshan Moradi, and Roozbeh Pournader.

== Farzanegan Schools in Tehran ==
Tehran enjoys a number of Farzaneghan Schools for girls.

NODET Farzaneghan Schools for girls in Tehran

== See also ==
- Gifted education
- Tehran's Allame Helli 3 High School
