= Shahid Soltani School =

Shahid Soltani
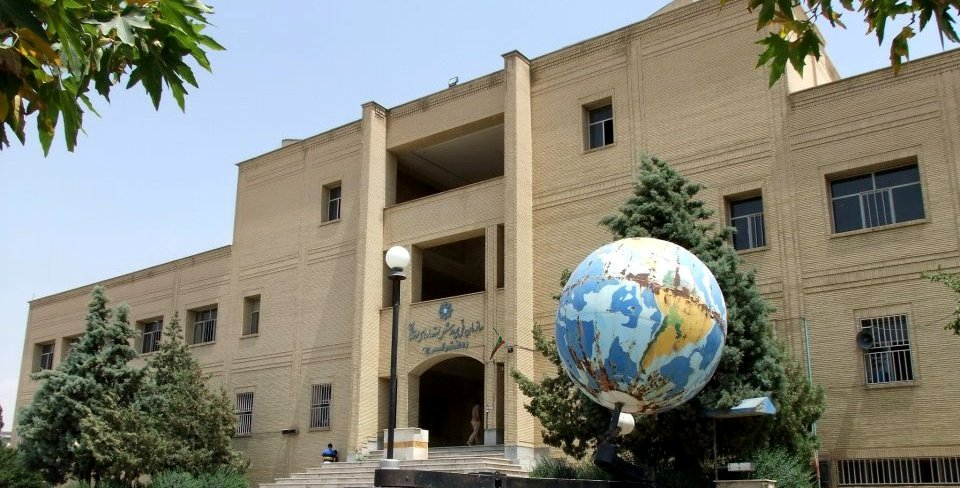

Location
- Karaj, Alborz Province; Iran
- Coordinates: 35°50′14″N 50°59′40″E

Information
- Type: Selective school
- Established: 17 October 1990
- Affiliations: National Organization for Development of Exceptional Talents

Shahid Soltani School is a NODET (National Organization for Development of Exceptional Talents, also known as SAMPAD) School for talented students in Karaj, Alborz Province, Iran. Shahid Soltani is among nationwide schools developed to provide education for exceptionally talented students in Iran, and are managed by the National Organization for Development of Exceptional Talents. Students are selected through a citywide entrance exam that is designed to measure intelligence. Students study subjects in depth.

The school occupies an area of 4430 square meters. Shahid Soltani Currently hosts an exhibit of students' discoveries and inventions named Huger that is in the last week of every year and it is controlled and managed by students.

== History ==
The school is named after Gholamreza Soltani. The school was founded on 17 October 1990 by Mr. SahabAli Fazli at 45.m Mehr-shahr Street in a house. After 4 years the school moved to Heydar-abad, south of Shahin-villa, and the next year it moved to Shahed St. Motahari Ave. Azadegan Sq.

== Notable alumni ==
- Alireza Salehi Golsefidy, winner of gold medal of national and silver medal of international olympiad of mathematics (1997)
- Jaber Zarezadeh, winner of gold medal of national and international olympiad of mathematics (2006)
- Saeed Ilchi, winner of gold medal of national and International Olympiad of Informatics (2012)
- Aref Moqadam Mehr, first place of International RoboCup Iran-Open (2012, 2013, 2014)
- Armin Asefi, Bronze Medal For the Mobile Application Development in IranSkills National Competitions (2023)
