= National Organization for Development of Exceptional Talents =

Iranian organization for exceptional students

- سازمان ملی پرورش استعدادهای درخشان
- Iran

Information
- Other name: Sampad
- Former name: National Iranian Organization for Gifted and Talented Education (NIOGATE)
- Type: Selective
- Established: 1976
- Founder: Iraj Broomand
- President: Elham Yavari
- Publication: Exceptional Talents (1992–2007)
- Website: sampad.gov.ir

National Organization for Development of Exceptional Talents (NODET; also known by its native acronym SAMPAD) is an Iranian organization founded in 1976 that governs a series of selective schools.

== History ==
The organization was founded in the autumn of 1976 by Iraj Broomand as National Iranian Organization for Gifted and Talented Education (NIOGATE), with two mixed-gender schools in Tehran (Alvand and Bolvar), with a budget of 13 million tomans. It was to serve as a model of excellence for education in Iran. This innovative organization was short-lived but its influence in the country was significant. Several international and American organizations collaborated with this nascent program, including the University of Southern California and the United Nations Education Commission.

After the 1979 Revolution, the organization was continuing its work unofficially, until it was re-established in 1987 as National Organization for Development of Exceptional Talents (NODET; Persian: سازمان ملی پرورش استعدادهای درخشان Sāzmān-e Melli-ye Parvaresh-e Este'dādhā-ye Derakhshān, acronym سمپاد SAMPAD).

== Schools ==
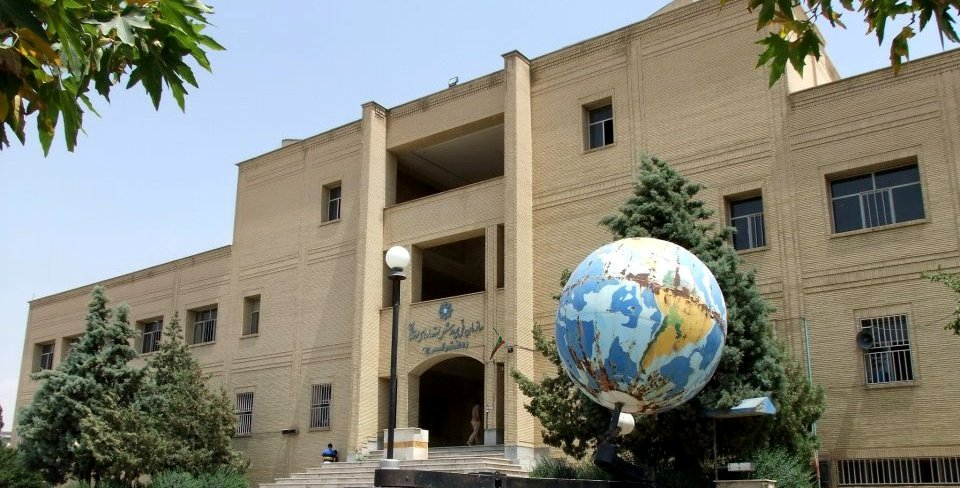
Shahid Soltani School, a SAMPAD boys school in Karaj, Iran

The organization has 99 middle schools and 98 high schools.

The schools are informally called Tizhooshan (تیزهوشان, literally "sharp minds"). The boys schools in Tehran are often named Allameh Helli (علامه حلی) and the girls schools are often named Farzanegan (فرزانگان).

== Entrance ==
The organization recruits students annually through a two-step set of nationwide exams at both middle school and high school levels. The tests are designed to measure intelligence, talent and creativity rather than prior knowledge. The rate of acceptance is less than 5% for the thousands of students who apply annually.

The entrance for the educational and administrative staff is also selective. The teachers tend to be the best in the country.

== Education system ==
The educational materials, facilities, instructional methodologies, coursework and curriculum are different in these schools, and intended to develop the students' talents.

The courses are college-level in fields such as biology, chemistry, mathematics, physics and English. The schools usually offer only two majors, mathematics-physics and experimental sciences.

Virtually all medals in the Iranian Science Olympiads are won by the NODET students. The students are also top performers in many International Science Olympiads.

== Alumni ==
NODET alumni usually pursue higher education up to postgraduate level.

Some of the alumni are world class researchers in STEM fields and medicine. Notable alumni include the mathematician Maryam Mirzakhani, chess grandmaster Elshan Moradi, computer scientist Farinaz Koushanfar, and Unicode expert Roozbeh Pournader.
