= List of gifted and talented programmes =

List of gifted and talented programs is a list of gifted education programs located all across the world.

== Africa ==
=== Egypt ===
- S.T.E.M. Egypt located in Cairo, a girl's branch in Maadi, a boy's branch in the 6th of October district, and a mixed branch in El Obour City.

=== Nigeria ===
- The Federal Government Academy, located in Niger State, Nigeria, also known as the Suleja Academy, founded in 1986.

== Asia ==
=== China ===
- Special Class for the Gifted Young of University of Science and Technology of China

=== Hong Kong ===
- The Hong Kong Academy for Gifted Education, located in Shatin, Hong Kong, also known as the HKAGE, founded in 2007.
- The Program for the Gifted and Talented (Link), Faculty of Education, The Chinese University of Hong Kong, located in Shatin, Hong Kong, also known as the PGT, founded in 1995.
- Provided by The University of Hong Kong: Primary School Programs, Secondary Programs and the Academy for the Talented

=== India ===
- Jawahar Navodaya Vidyalaya for the talented and gifted students predominantly from rural background without regards to their family's socio-economic conditions, located in almost every districts of India, founded in 1986.

=== Iran ===
- The National Organization for Development of Exceptional Talents, located in major cities of Iran, founded in 1986.

=== Israel ===
- The Larom Program, located in Kiryat Malachi, Israel.

=== Jordan ===
- The Jubilee School, located in Amman, Jordan, also known as The Jubilee Institute, founded in 1993.
- The King's Academy, located in Madaba-Manja, Jordan, founded in 2007.

=== Malaysia ===
- The PERMATApintar National Gifted Center, located in Selangor, Malaysia, founded in 2009.
- Kolej GENIUS Insan. located in Nilai, Malaysia, founded in 2010

=== Philippines ===
- Philippine Science High School (various campuses)
- Regional Science High School (various campuses)
- Engineering and Science Education Program (various public or private science high schools)

=== Singapore ===
- Gifted Education Programme

=== South Korea ===
- The Gwangju Science High School, located in Gwangju, South Korea, founded in 1984.
- The Daegu Science High School, located in Daegu, South Korea, founded in 1987.
- The Gyeonggi Science High School, located in Suwon, South Korea, founded in 1983.
- The Korea Science Academy of KAIST, located in Busan, South Korea, founded in 1991.
- The Seoul Science High School for Gifted Students, located in Seoul, South Korea, founded in 1989.

=== Vietnam ===
- List of high schools for the gifted in Vietnam

== Europe ==
=== Austria ===
- Sir-Karl-Popper-Schule, Vienna

=== Czech Republic ===
- Talnet

=== Denmark ===
- Mentiqa schools

=== Germany ===
- Sächsisches Landesgymnasium Sankt Afra zu Meißen for gifted students
- Landesgymnasium für Hochbegabte Schwäbisch Gmünd

=== Greece ===
- CTY Greece at Anatolia College

=== Republic of Ireland ===
- Centre for the Talented Youth of Ireland

=== Norway ===
- Mentiqa-school at Slottsfjellskolen, Tønsberg, County of Vestfold (Awaiting approval from The Norwegian Directorate for Education and Training)

=== Poland ===
- Polish Children's Fund

=== Serbia ===
- Matematička Gimnazija
- Petnica Science Center

=== Switzerland ===
- Talenta

=== Turkey ===
- Istanbul Erkek Lisesi
- TEV İnanç Türkeş High School for Gifted Students

=== United Kingdom ===
- Young Gifted and Talented Programme
- Potential Plus UK
- Gift Summer School

== North America ==
=== Canada ===
Alberta

- G.A.T.E.
- Westmount Charter School

British Columbia

- Choice School for the Gifted and Exceptional
- MACC (Multi Age Cluster Class)
- University Transition Program

Ontario

- Academy for Gifted Children
- Cedarview Middle School
- Lorne Park Secondary School
- Martingrove Collegiate Institute
- The Woodlands School
- Woburn Collegiate Institute

Quebec

- Centennial Regional High School

Saskatchewan

- Walter Murray Collegiate Institute
- Bedford Road Collegiate Institute

=== Mexico ===
- CEPAC: Centro Educativo para Altas Capacidades

=== United States ===
As of 2002, only 37 US states have laws requiring that some services be made available for the gifted. Of these, approximately 28 require that the services must be adequate to meet the educational needs of every gifted student. There is one federal law with respect to gifted education. The Jacob K. Javits Gifted & Talented Student Education Act of 1988 was renewed as part of the Elementary and Secondary Education Act in 1994 and as part of the No Child Left Behind Act of 2001.

Alabama

- Alabama School of Mathematics and Science

Arizona

- Flex Center
- Alhambra Elementary School District

California

- Gifted and Talented Education (G.A.T.E.)
- Education Program for Gifted Youth and High School at Stanford University
- Early Entrance Program, Los Angeles, California
- MCP Middle and High School, Santa Cruz, California
- The Nueva School, Hillsborough and San Mateo, California
- Helios School, Sunnyvale, California
- Tessellations School, Cupertino, California

Colorado

- Rocky Mountain Talent Search and The Logan School for Creative Learning at the University of Denver

Connecticut

- Jewish High School of Connecticut Gifted Program

Florida

- Pine View School, Osprey

Illinois

- Office of Academic Enhancement in Chicago Public Schools
- Northwestern University Center for Talent Development
- Illinois Mathematics and Science Academy
- Barefoot Technology Academy (virtual)

Indiana

- Indiana Academy for Science, Mathematics, and Humanities
- Gifted Education Resource Institute, Purdue University

Iowa

- The Belin-Blank Center for Gifted Education and Talent Development at the University of Iowa

Kentucky

- Center for Gifted Studies at Western Kentucky University
  - Summer Program for Verbally and Mathematically Precocious Youth
- Gatton Academy
- Liberal Arts Academy at Henry Clay High School

Louisiana

- Louisiana School for Math, Science, and the Arts

Maryland

- Center for Talented Youth at Johns Hopkins University

Massachusetts

- Acera School
- Bard College at Simon's Rock

Michigan

- The Roeper School
- Gifted and Talented Education (GATE) at Michigan State University

Mississippi

- Mississippi School for Mathematics and Science

Nevada

- Davidson Institute for Talent Development

New York

- The Anderson School
- Frederick Law Olmsted School
- Henry Viscardi School
- Hunter College High School
- Long Island School for the Gifted
- Prep for Prep
- Special Music School
- Speyer Legacy School

North Carolina

- North Carolina School of Science and Mathematics
- Talent Identification Program at Duke University

Ohio

- The Schilling School for Gifted Children
- Menlo Park Academy

South Carolina

- Palmetto Scholars Academy

Texas

- School for the Talented and Gifted
- Texas Academy of Mathematics and Science at University of North Texas
- Texas Academy of Leadership in the Humanities at Lamar University

Virginia

- Center for Gifted Education at College of William & Mary
- Program for the Exceptionally Gifted at Mary Baldwin University

Washington

- Open Window School, Bellevue

== Oceania ==
=== Australia ===
New South Wales

- Gifted Education Research, Resource and Information Centre (GERRIC), The University of New South Wales
- Selective school: Government high schools where students are admitted based on academic merit.
- Gifted and Talented Program, Macquarie University
- The University of New England - gifted programs at the undergraduate, Masters level, Graduate Certificate, and Research at Ph.D. and Doctoral level (online).

Queensland

- Queensland Association for Gifted and Talented Children

South Australia

- Ignite programme, Department of Education and Children's Services
- Australian Science and Mathematics School
- Dara School

== South America ==
=== Brazil ===
Brasília - Distrito Federal

- Programa de Enriquecimento para Superdotados e Talentosos
- Conselho Brasileiro de Superdotação (ConBrasSD)
- Associação de Pais, Professores e Amigos dos Alunos com Altas Habilidades/Superdotação do Distrito Federal (APAHS-DF)

Minas Gerais

- Centro para Desenvolvimento do Potencial e Talento (CEDET)

Paraná

- Instituto Para Otimização de Talentos (INODAP)
- Núcleo de Estudos e Práticas em Altas Habilidades e Superdotação (NEPAHS)

Rio de Janeiro

- Instituto Rogério Steinberg (IRS)

São Paulo

- Associação Paulista para Altas Habilidades/Superdotação (APAHSD)
- Instituto Social Para Motivar, Apoiar e Reconhecer Talentos (ISMART)
- Instituto Alpha Lumen (IAL)
- Núcleo de Apoio Pedagógico Especializado (CAPE)
