= ATYP =

ATYP may refer to:

- Academically Talented Youth Programs
- Australian Theatre for Young People
