= Menlo Park =

Menlo Park may refer to:

== Places ==
- Menlo Park, New Jersey, a section of Edison, New Jersey, location of Thomas Edison's laboratories
  - Menlo Park Mall, a shopping mall in Edison
  - Menlo Park Terrace, New Jersey, a section of nearby Woodbridge Township, New Jersey
- Menlo Park, California, a city in San Mateo County, U.S.
  - Menlo Park City School District
  - Menlo Park station, a train station in Menlo Park, California, U.S.
- Menlo Park, Pretoria, a suburb in South Africa
- Menlo Park, a historical neighborhood of Tucson, Arizona

== Other ==
- Menlo Park (band), an alternative-rock band
- Menlo Park Academy, a school in Cleveland

== See also ==
- Menlo (disambiguation)
- West Menlo Park, California, an unincorporated community in San Mateo County, California, U.S.
