= Academically Talented Youth Programs =

Begun in 1981, ATYP – Academically Talented Youth Programs – is a K-12/higher education collaborative model that works cooperatively with over 60 public and private school districts.

Sixth through eight graders are assessed for their higher-level math and verbal potential identified through the Midwest Academic Talent Search (MATS). They attend ATYP's weekly 2 hour and 50 minutes class. The student's SAT scores, rather than their grade level, indicate their readiness for the classes. Qualifying scores, set at levels similar to Talent Search’s summer programs, use the SAT English score to indicate readiness for the writing/literature class. The SAT math score, and combined math plus English score, qualify students for the math class. Because the program focuses on serving higher levels of potential, very few students qualify for both the English and the math class.

The students’ motivation to work hard alongside their commitment to the program's rigor contributes to their ultimate success. Independent and small group work helps students complete the 6-12 hour weekly homework assignment. Housed on the campus of Western Michigan University in Kalamazoo and Grand Valley State University in Grand Rapids, ATYP provides fast-paced classes during the school year, in conjunction with the student's regular school schedule. ATYP's first two years cover the four years of high school content; the third year focuses at the AP English Language and Composition / AP English Literature and Composition level. Because the course's students need to be challenged at all ages, not only at high school age, the ATYP model begins to identify students who will perform well in the classes at as early as 5th grade. Once identified, the students are invited to take the SAT or ACT to see if they can qualify.
