= Menlo =

Menlo may refer to:

== Geography ==
- Menlo, County Galway, Ireland
- Menlo Park (disambiguation), multiple places

=== United States ===
- Menlo, Georgia
- Menlo, Iowa
- Menlo, Kansas
- Menlo, Washington

== Institutions ==
- Menlo College, Atherton, California
- Menlo School, an independent, private college preparatory school in Atherton, California
- Menlo-Atherton High School, California

== Other uses ==
- Menlo Worldwide, a global supply chain company based in California
- Menlo (typeface), shipped with Mac OS X
- Chevrolet Menlo

== See also ==
- Menlough
- Menlo Park (disambiguation)
