= PERMATApintar National Gifted Center =

PERMATApintar National Gifted Center, UKM
- Pusat PERMATApintar Negara, UKM
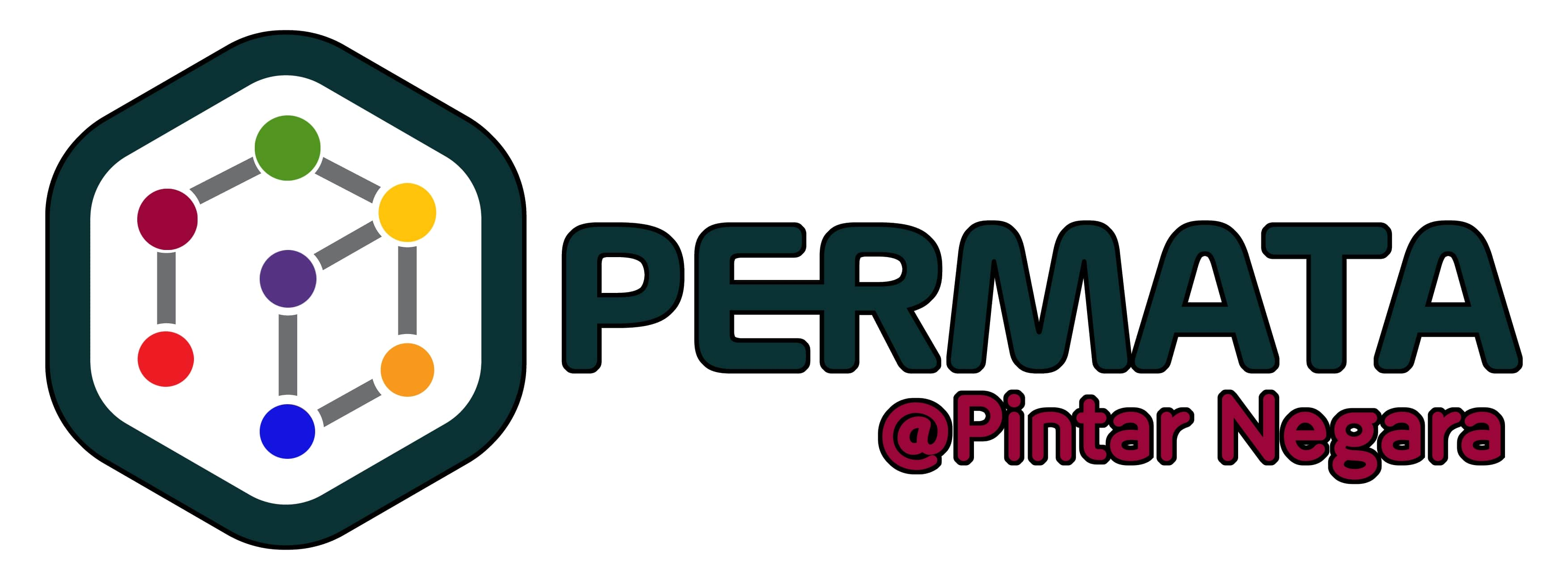

Location
- Pusat PERMATApintar Negara, Universiti Kebangsaan Malaysia; Bangi, Selangor, 43600; Malaysia; 02.917306°N 101.788167°E

Information
- Type: Charter School, Gifted School, Boarding School
- Motto: Explore, Innovate and Unique
- Established: 3 April 2009
- School code: BEA4001 (Malaysia Ministry of Education); 686341 (College Board)
- Director: Prof. Dr. Yazrina binti Yahya
- Grades: Foundation 1 – Foundation 3 Level 1 – Level 2
- Gender: Mixed
- Enrolment: 450
- Average class size: 16
- Language: Malay, English
- Campus size: 22 hectares
- Colour: Maroon
- Accreditation: Malaysian Ministry of Education; US College Board
- Newspaper: Bitara News
- Website: www.ukm.my/permatapintar

The PERMATApintar Gifted Center, UKM, more commonly known as the Malaysian National Gifted Centre, UKM is a gifted center that provides education services for gifted and talented Malaysian students aged 12 – 17 in Malaysia. It was established by University Kebangsaan Malaysia to support the Malaysian Gifted and Talented Program mooted by Datin Seri Rosmah Mansor in 2009; wife of the former Prime Minister of Malaysia, Dato' Seri Najib Razak. Universiti Kebangsaan Malaysia under the leadership of then Vice Chancellor, Tan Sri Dato Wira Dr. Sharifah Hapsah binti Syed Hasan Shahabudin was appointed as the implementer of the program. Professor Datuk Dr. Noriah Mohd Ishak was then appointed as the first Director of the Malaysian National Gifted Center Pusat PERMATApintar Negara, UKM. Her role was to develop assessment tools to search for the gifted and talented, develop the academic pathways for gifted and talented Malaysian children, develop a comprehensive and challenging curriculum for the gifted and talented Malaysian students, and implement the program effectively with the support of UKM, for the benefit of gifted and talented Malaysian students. It is the only program in Malaysia that identifies academically gifted and talented students. PERMATApintar currently offers three programmes: the Summer Camp programme (PPCS), the PERMATApintar College programme, and the ASASIpintar programme (UKM Pre-university programme).

== Asasipintar, UKM ==
The Asasipintar, UKM program was developed to bridge students from the PERMATApintar College to the university, in particular, UKM. The program is also offered to SPM school leavers who scored well in the national examination. It is a fast-track one-year program aimed at preparing students for campus learning. The program is STEM-based and offers courses like physics, Chemistry, Biology, Statistics, Calculus, Algebra, Language Appreciation, Research, and Self-Development. A small number of students are also offered courses in Economy, Law, and Psychology Students have to complete 50 credit hours courses within the one-year stipulated time. Upon completion and depending on their CGPA, students can apply to the faculty of their choice.

In 2019, the PERMATA program was rebranded and renamed Genius as it underwent a process to enhance in terms of quality of the child development program.

== History ==
PERMATApintar National Gifted Center, UKM is the first gifted school in Malaysia. Established on 3 April 2009, Datin Seri Rosmah Mansor, then First Lady of Malaysia planned to have a school for Malaysian gifted students after visiting various countries' gifted schools as early as 2006. To realize her plan, a series of discussions with local and foreign experts took place to come up with a suitable program in Malaysia.

The controversial programme was started nearly a decade ago after Najib Razak then took office. However, the previous Barisan Nasional (BN) administration had claimed that Rosmah was not involved in Permata's day-to-day operations. A working paper of PERMATApintar was then approved by the Former Prime Minister of Malaysia, Najib in 2008. The National University of Malaysia was appointed to implement the program with the funds disbursed from the PERMATA Division of the Prime Minister's Department. An agreement was made in Kuala Lumpur in April 2009 with the Johns Hopkins University - Center for Talented Youth to help kick-start the program.

In January 2010, the National University of Malaysia gave a 22-acre (89,000 m^{2}) land located at Bukit Puteri to the government to build the PERMATApintar complex. Its first director was Prof Datuk Dr Noriah Mohd. Ishak. The construction was divided into two phases. The construction of Phase 1 started in early 2010 and finished at the end of 2010 with the allocation of RM23 million. The second phase was constructed right after the completion of the first phase in February 2011 with an allocation of RM54 million. The second phase was finished in December 2011. The first batch of Level 1 students started their study in PERMATApintar National Gifted Center in January 2011.

In 2013, the third phase of the construction started in April 2013 fully funded by the Al-Bukhary Foundation. The construction involved the auditorium and the sports center. The construction was finished in October 2014.

In 2014, PERMATApintar started receiving its first batch of Foundation 1 students, aged 12 and 13 years old, who will study in PERMATApintar for five years.

In 2015, then-minister Datuk Seri Shahidan Kassim said as patron of the program, Rosmah does not handle any administrative, financial, or managerial matters, as well as other functions that come under the purview of the civil service.

After Pakatan Harapan (PH) took over the government after the 2018 general election (GE14), Deputy Prime Minister Datuk Seri Dr Wan Azizah Wan Ismail said the new administration would not pull the plug on Permata, but would audit and review the program. In 2018, PERMATApintar National Gifted Center was transferred to Sektor Pengurusan PERMATA, School Management Division, Ministry of Education from PERMATA Division, Prime Minister's Department.

In 2019, the Education Minister Dr. Maszlee Malik announced the PERMATA programme renamed Genius as it underwent a rebranding process to make the child development programme more competitive and highly motivated.

In 2023, the Education Minister Fadhlina Sidek reannounced the GENIUS programme to be reverted to the PERMATA name, or PERMATA@Pintar to be exact, in efforts to clarify translation efforts by third party members.

== Campus ==
The PERMATApintar National Gifted Center is located on the Bangi campus of the National University of Malaysia, one of the most prestigious public universities in Malaysia. It is situated in the developing town of Bangi which is easily accessible by the North–South Expressway (Malaysia) via the Bangi exit and the KTM Komuter UKM station.

There are 15 buildings and a sports complex on PERMATApintar's 22-acre (89,000 m^{2}) UKM campus, including the academic and residential sectors. The campus is divided into three phases. It is located at Bukit Puteri, UKM, Bangi. Two phases finished in December 2011 whereas the third phase finished in October 2014. The first phase consists of 5 buildings whereas the second phase consists of 5 residential buildings and the remaining academic buildings. The auditorium and the sports complex are a part of the expansion project funded by the Al-Bukhary Foundation.

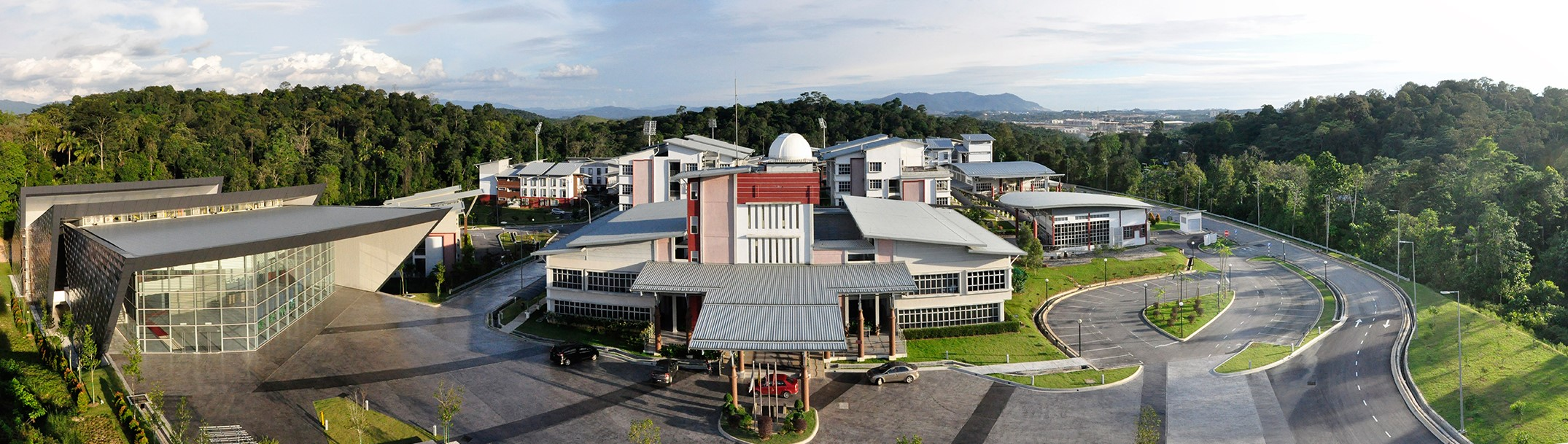
PERMATApintar National Gifted Center Complex

Work on Phase 1 started in early 2010 and finished at the end of 2010. In Phase 1, it consists of five buildings: an administration block, an academic building with eight classrooms, a laboratory block, a multipurpose hall, and a cafeteria.

The administration block consisted of three offices, a library, an open hall, a surau, an event room, two meeting rooms, and an observatory. The offices are the PERMATApintar High School Programme Office, ASASIpintar (UKM Pre-University) Programme Office, and Talent Search (Summer Camp Programme) Office.

Right after Phase 1 was completed, the construction of Phase 2 started: in February 2011. It was completed in December 2011. In Phase two, consisted of an instructor's block, a laboratory block, an academic building, four hostel buildings, a dining hall, and a school minimart. All of the Science labs in this block are used for the ASASIpintar Programme. The academic building consisted of 12 classes of which four are for the ASASIpintar Programme.

The auditorium and the sports center were contributed by the Al-Bukhary Foundation. The construction of these buildings started in January 2013 and finished in October 2014. The sports complex consisted of an Olympic-sized swimming pool, a football field, eight running tracks, and a mini-gym.

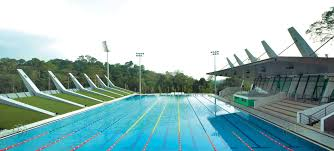

Since 2020, though, PERMATA@Pintar has opened a secondary campus in Seremban, situated in the campus of Institut Pendidikan Guru Kampus Raja Melewar. This campus was dedicated to the lower form students (Foundation or Asas 1 to 3) in efforts to rebuild the moral structure and brotherhood in lower forms.

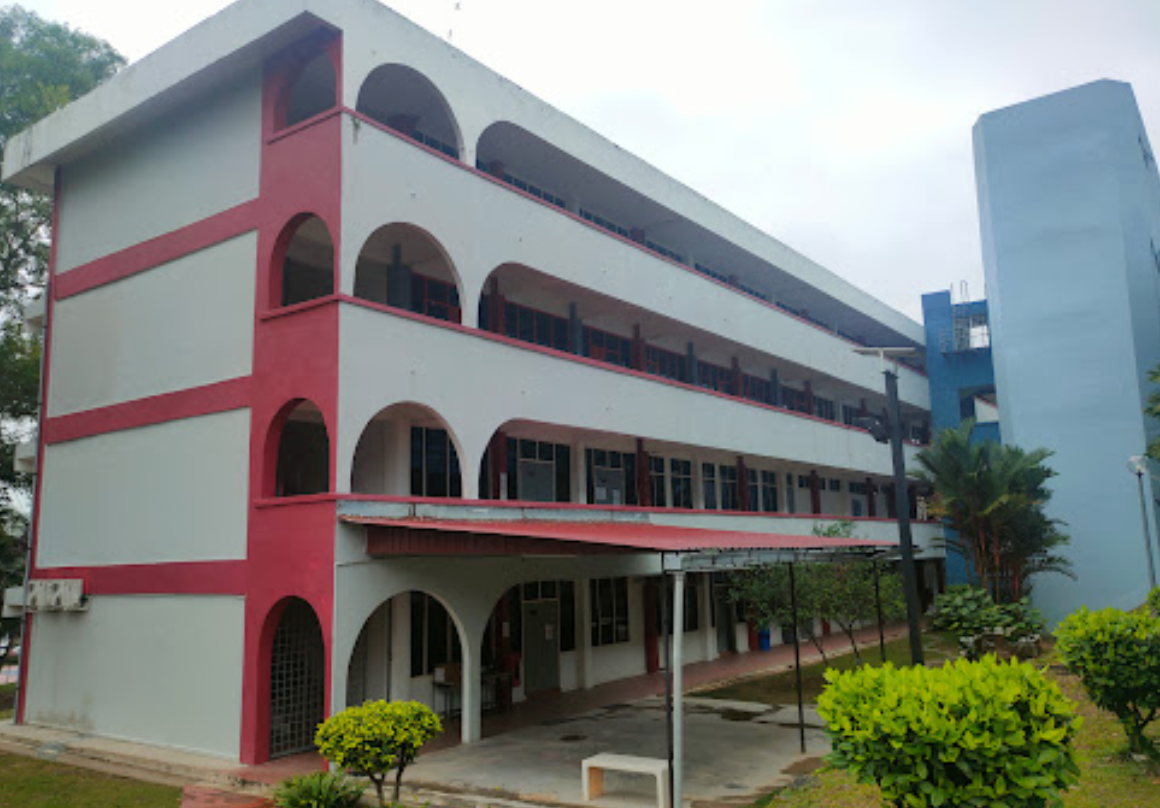
Academic Bloc of PERMATA@Pintar Seremban Campus

== Admission ==
The college conducts a student selection process every year. Any Malaysian students aged 9 to 15 are allowed to apply. In the selection process, there are three steps which are Ujian (Test) UKM1, Ujian (Test) UKM2, and Ujian (Test) UKM3 during the School Holiday Camp (PPCS). A student must pass Ujian UKM1, Ujian UKM2, successfully attend and complete School Holiday Camp (PPCS), and Ujian (Test) UKM3.

Ujian UKM1 is the first selection test for students who wish to join programmes under PERMATApintar. Students who passed the Ujian UKM1 are invited to join the Ujian UKM2 held in UKM2 centres across the country.

Ujian UKM2 is the second selection test to filter and search talented students who can join the School Holiday Camp. Those who pass UKM2 will then be invited to join the School Holiday Camp held in December every year.

School Holiday Camp or PPCS is an academic summer camp that offers 23 first-year university courses that develop students interests in STEM. PPCS is held twice each year, in June and December, until 2016 when the mid-year school holiday clashes with Ramadan, a fasting month for the Muslim majority in Malaysia. The December PPCS is held for three weeks whereas the June PPCS is held for two weeks. Those who are admitted to June PPCS are from the previous year's UKM2 participants.

The Ujian UKM3 or the third selection test is also conducted during the camp. Only those who passed UKM3 will then allowed to join the PERMATApintar High School programme. All participants were given a course based on their performance in UKM2. The courses given to the participants vary each year but some notable examples of courses are Logical Reasoning, Robotics, Ethnomathematics, Astrophysics and Green Technology.

== Syllabus ==
PERMATApintar uses Sijil Pelajaran Malaysia (SPM) curriculum as PERMATA's core curriculum with enrichment syllabus from Sijil Tinggi Pelajaran Malaysia (STPM) curriculum and United States' College Board Advanced Placement curriculum. The reason for merging the curriculum mentioned above is to develop a curriculum that could challenge the minds of Gifted student.

The academics offered at PERMATApintar College are divided into two programs which are the Foundation program and High school Diploma program. The Foundation Program is offered to Foundation 1, 2, and 3 students whereas the High school Diploma program is offered to Level 1 and 2 students.

The teaching and learning session in PERMATApintar is conducted based on the student-oriented learning system. Students who show extraordinary achievement in academic performance are allowed to join the Accelerated Learning Program which uses Curriculum Acceleration. The mode of teaching and learning is the Malay language for the national curriculum and English language is used if needed.

== Activities and events ==
=== Future Scientist Conference ===
Organized by PERMATApintar National Gifted Center, UKM, this annual conference is an avenue for High School Students to present and share their research experiences. This conference was first held in 2012 at PERMATApintar College, UKM, in Bangi, Selangor. All schools are invited to participate in this conference. Participants will then be paired with professors and lecturers in UKM to help in conducting the research.

=== Nobelist Mindset Programme ===
UKM in collaboration with The New York Academy of Sciences (NYAS) organized the first Nobelist Mindset Workshop which was held at Pusat PERMATApintar Negara, UKM from 27 until 31 January 2013. The program entered its fifth year when the programme was held at London in May 2017.

== Gallery ==
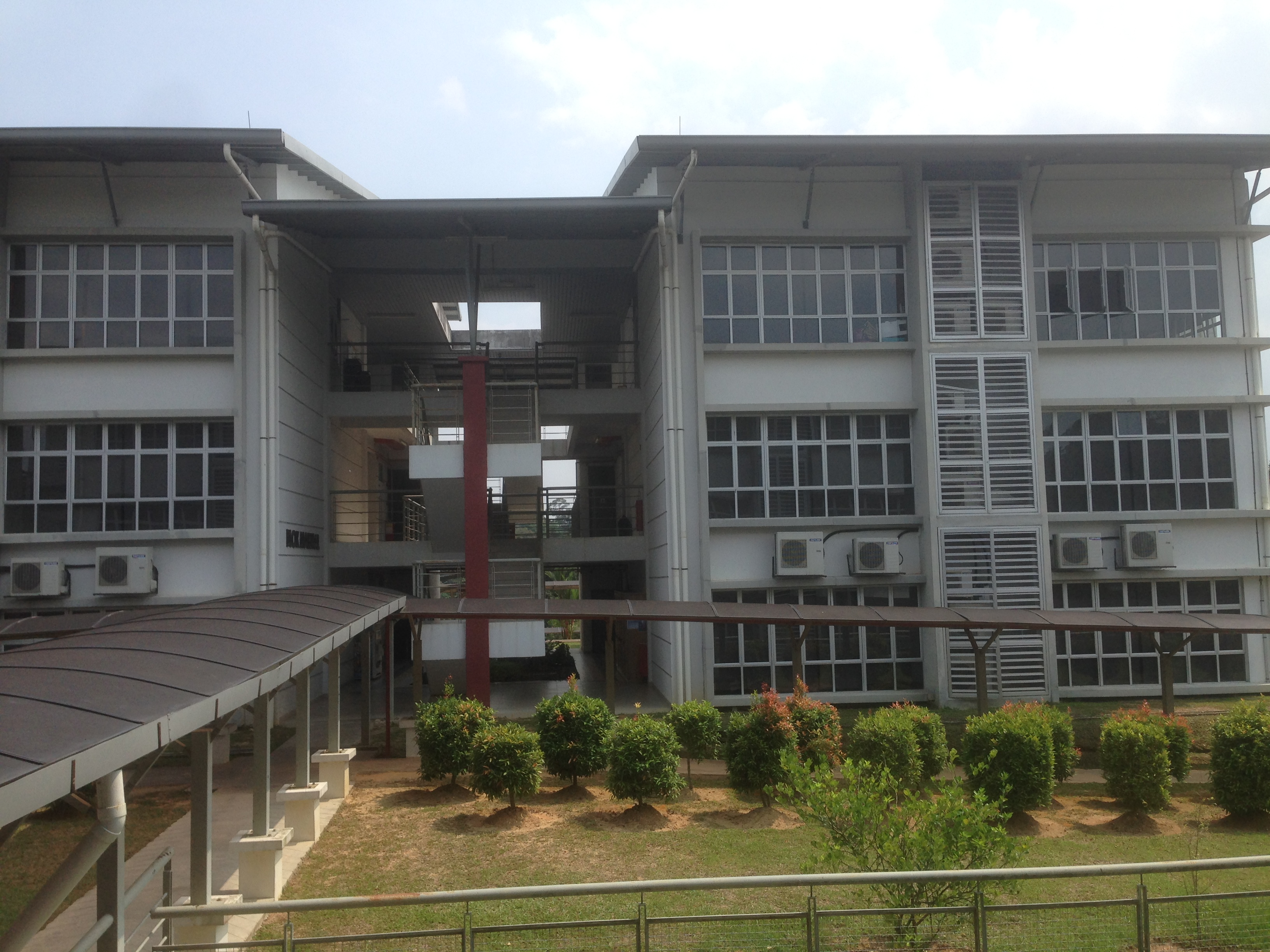
The laboratory block of PERMATApintar that was constructed in 2009 as a part of the first phase.

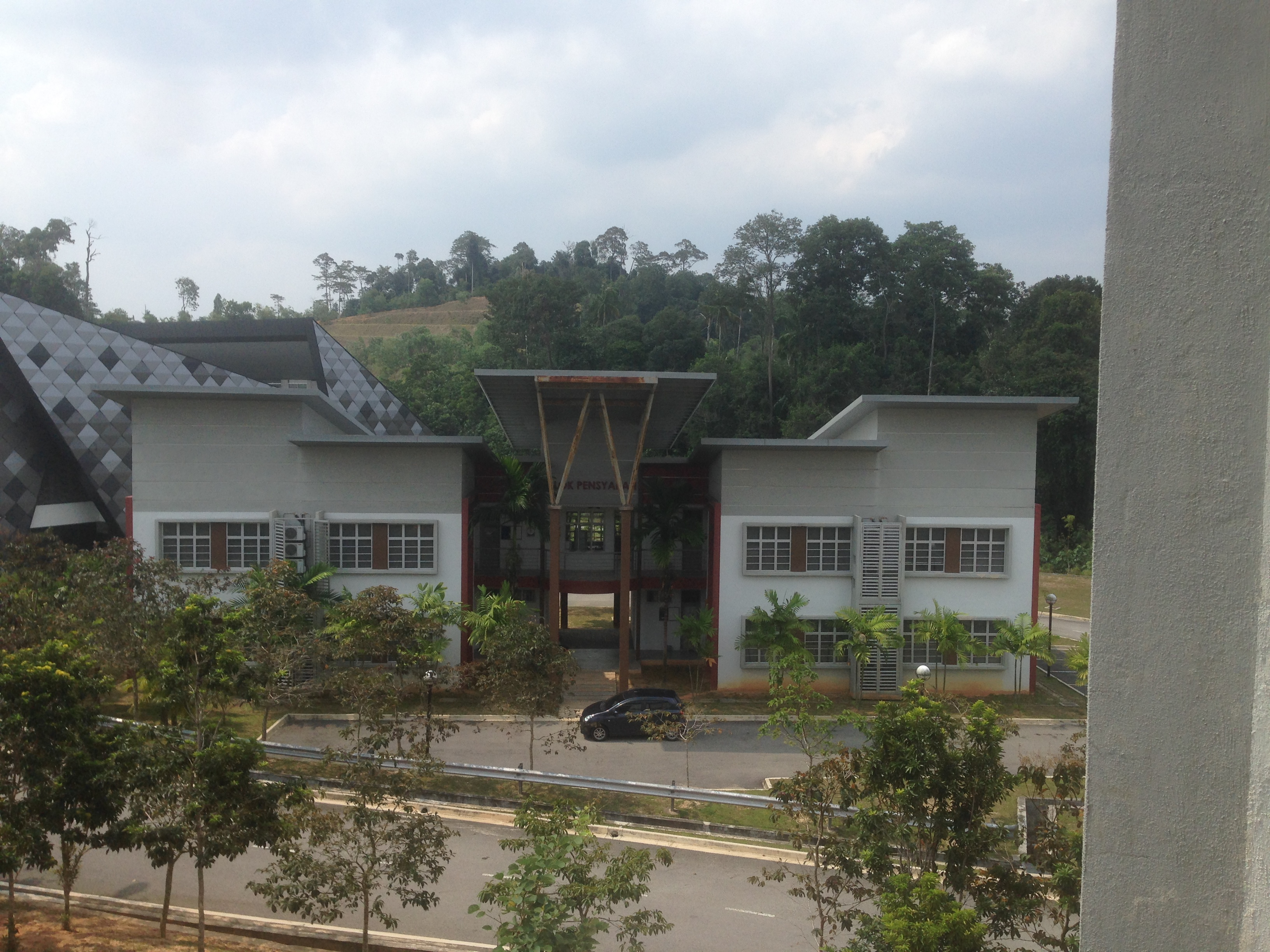
The instructors' block of PERMATApintar that was constructed in 2011 as a part of the second phase.

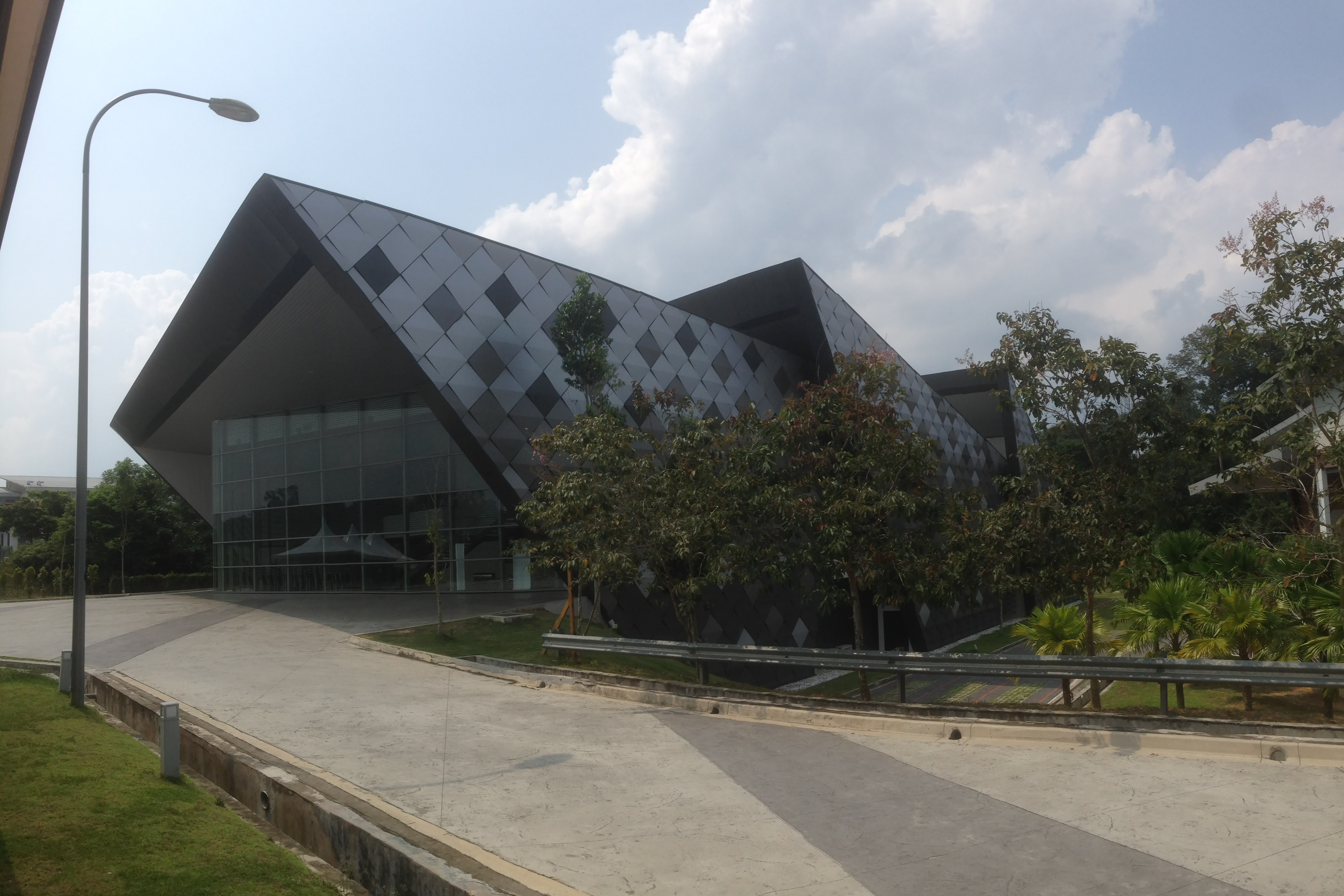
The auditorium of PERMATApintar was constructed in 2013 from a donation by Al-Bukhary Foundation.

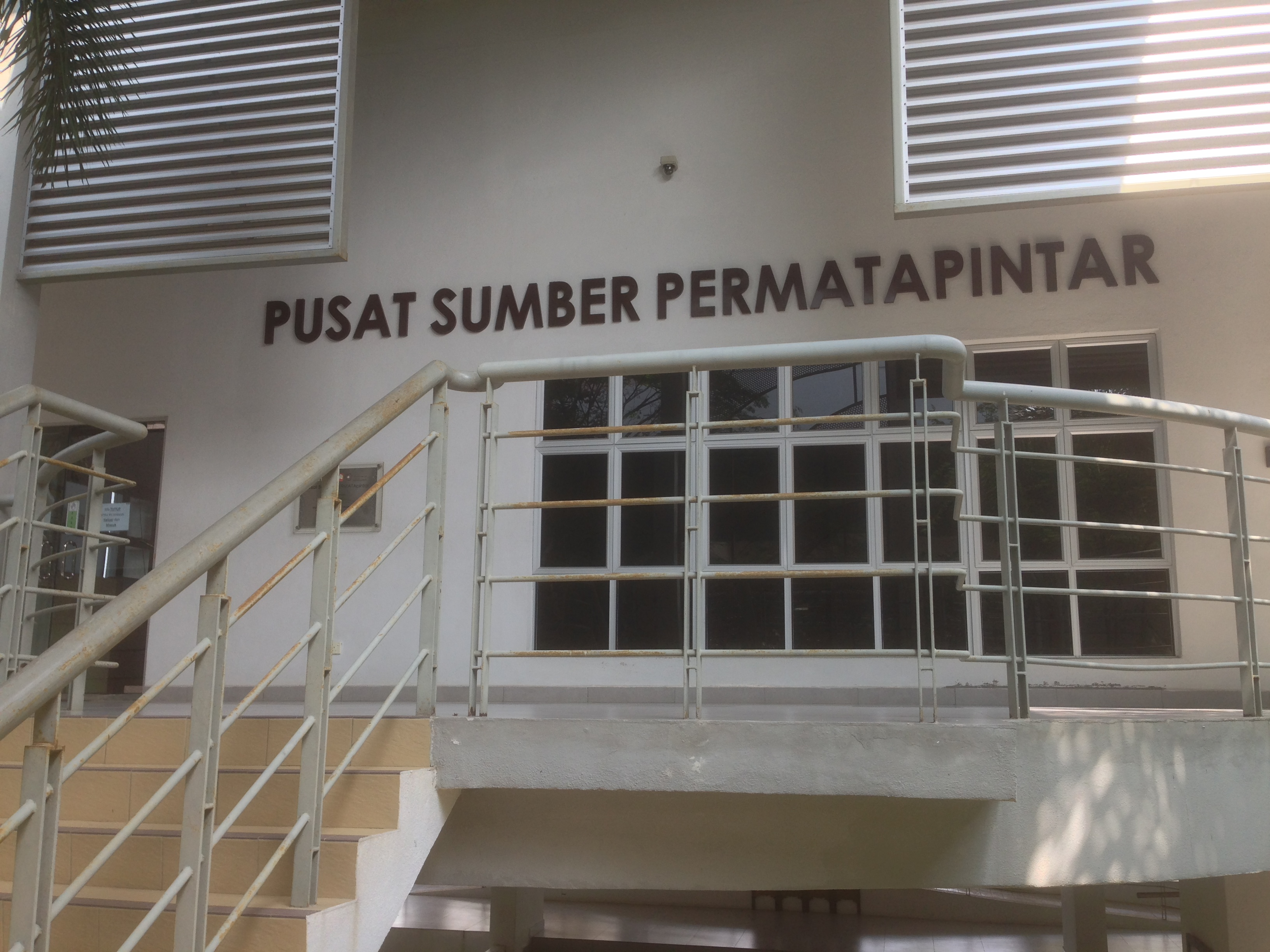
The library of PERMATApintar was constructed in 2009 as a part of the first phase.

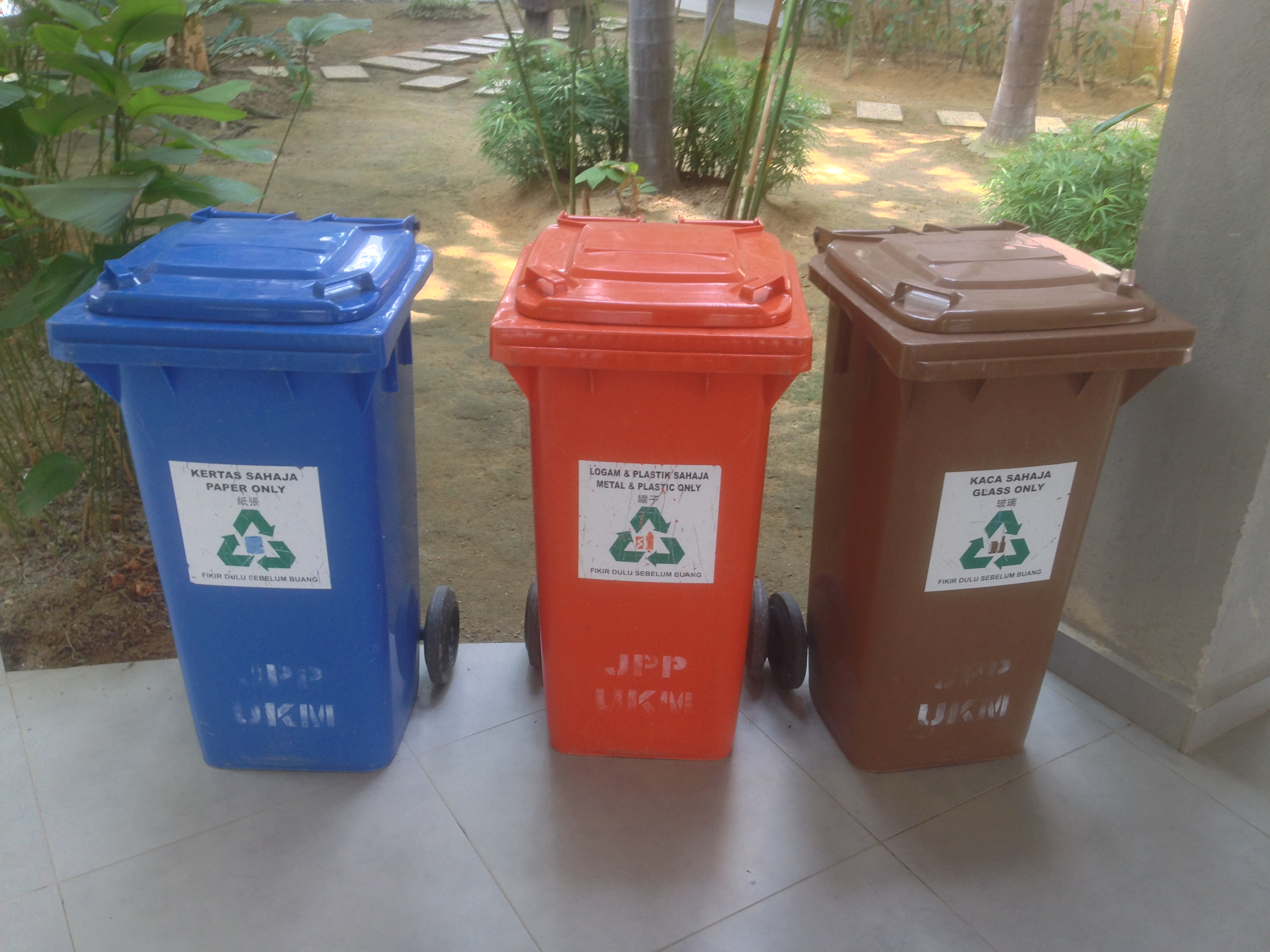
One of the many recycling bins available in PERMATApintar Complex.

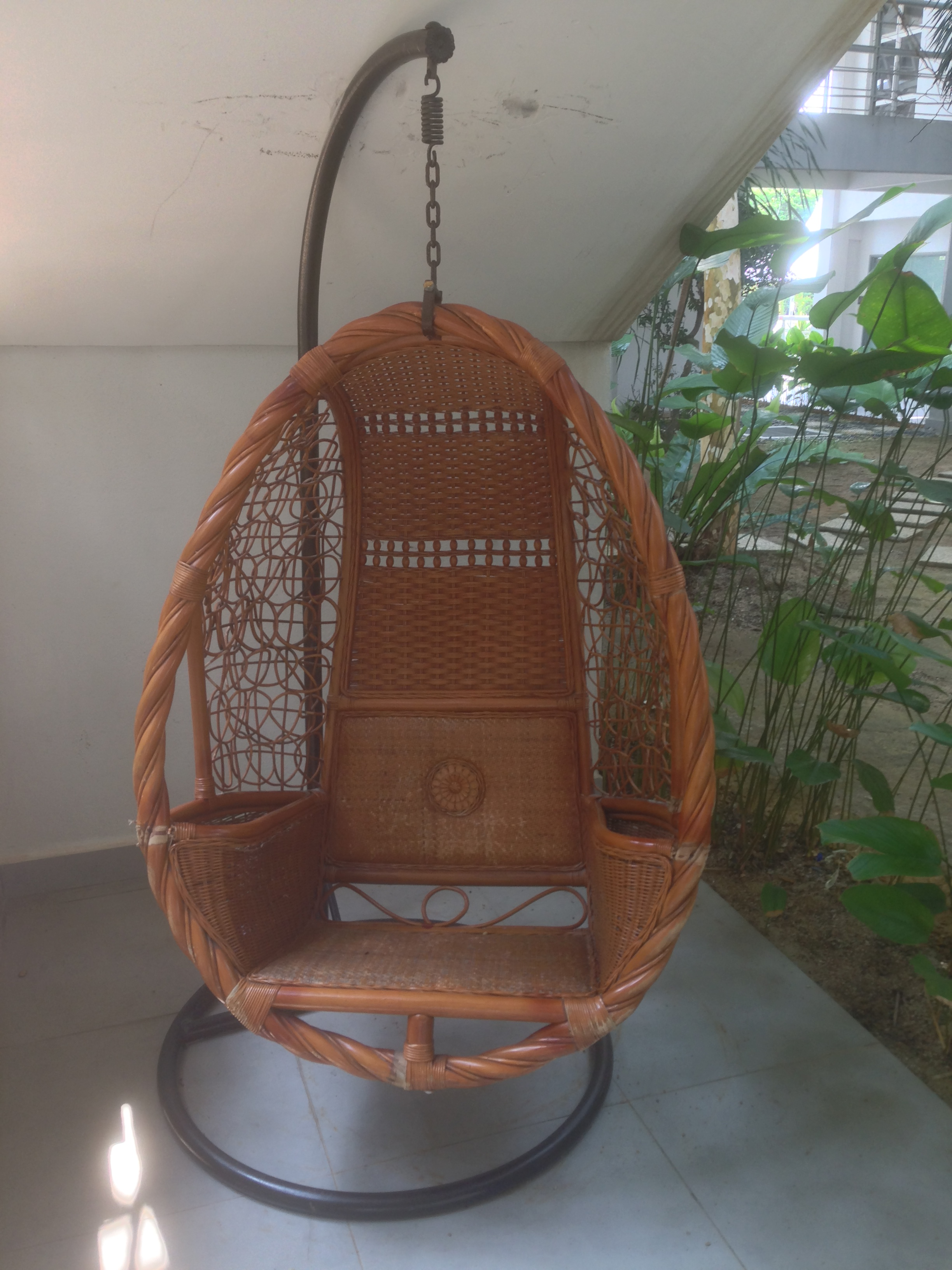
One of the rocking chairs available in PERMATApintar Complex.

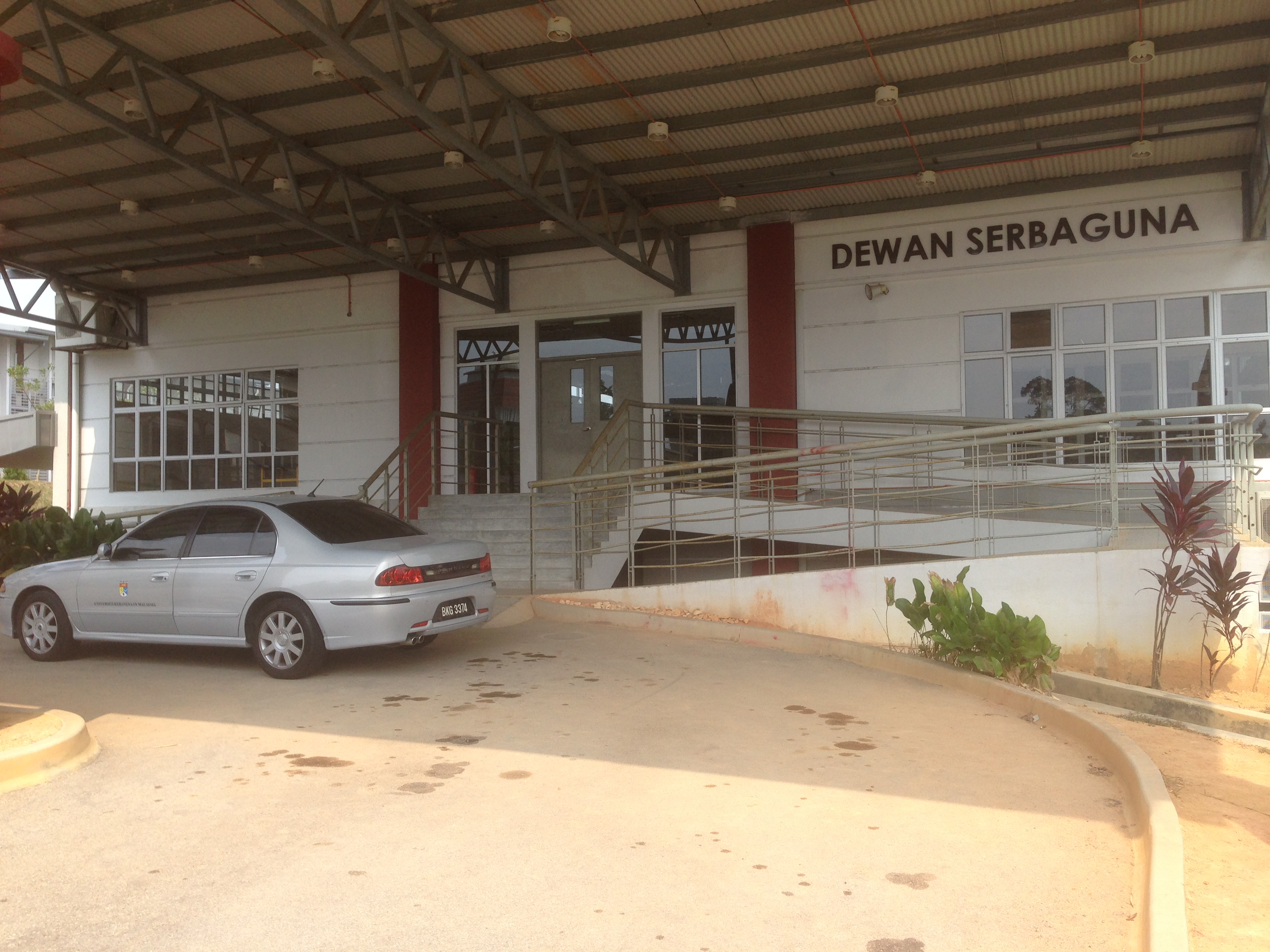
The multipurpose hall of PERMATApintar that was constructed in 2009 as a part of the first phase.

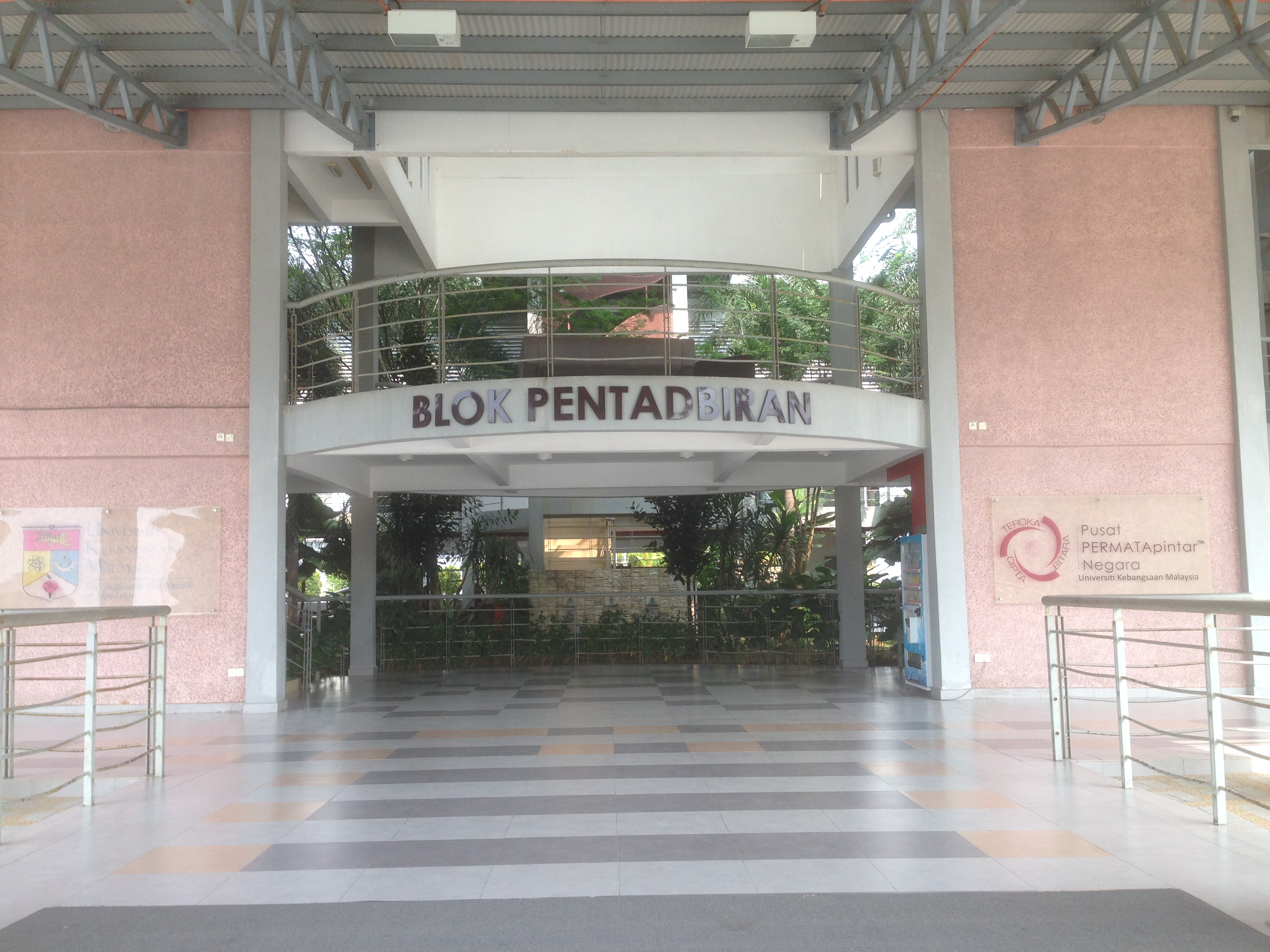
The administrators' block of PERMATApintar that was constructed in 2009 as a part of the first phase.

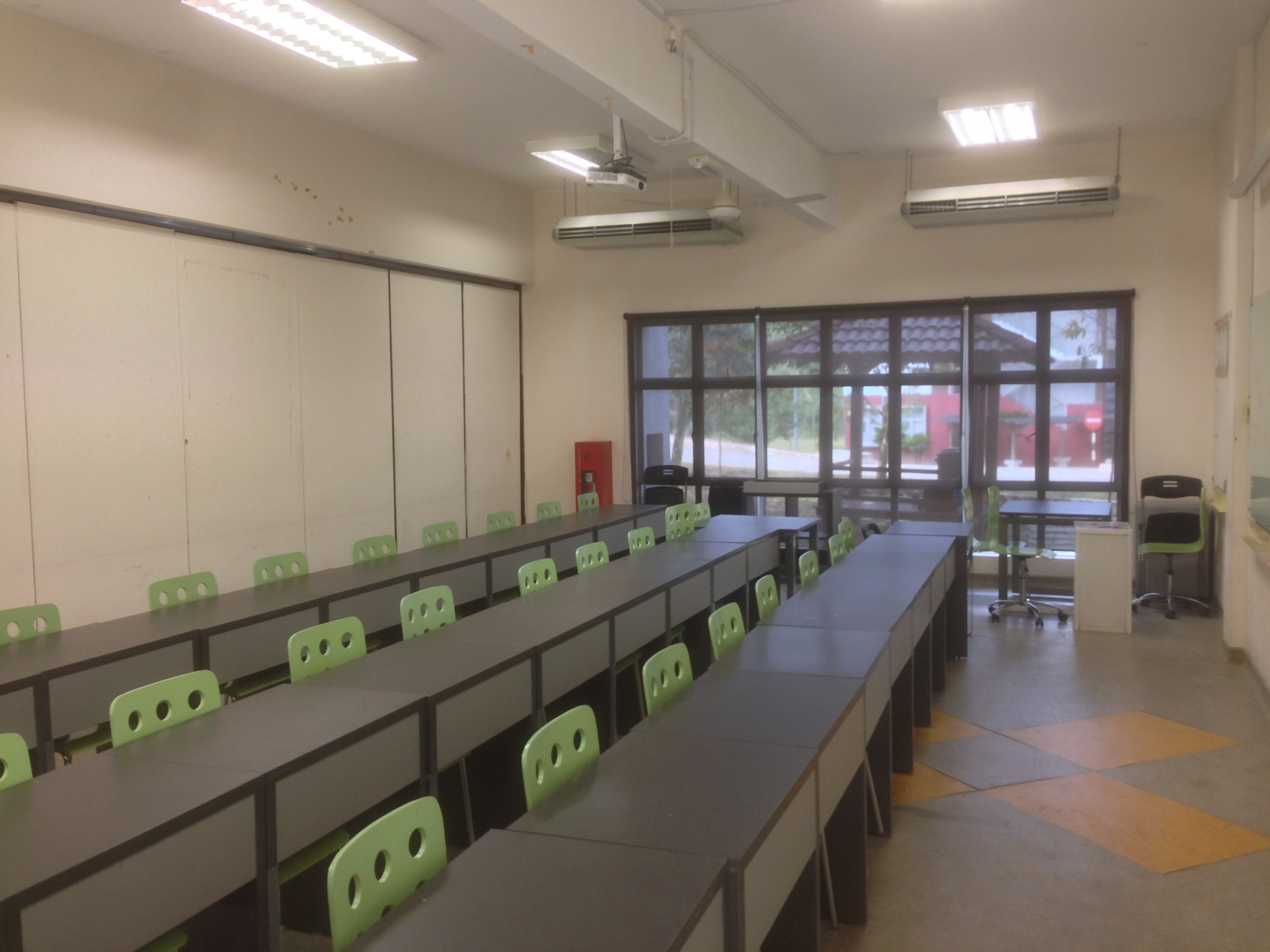
The interior of a classroom in PERMATApintar.

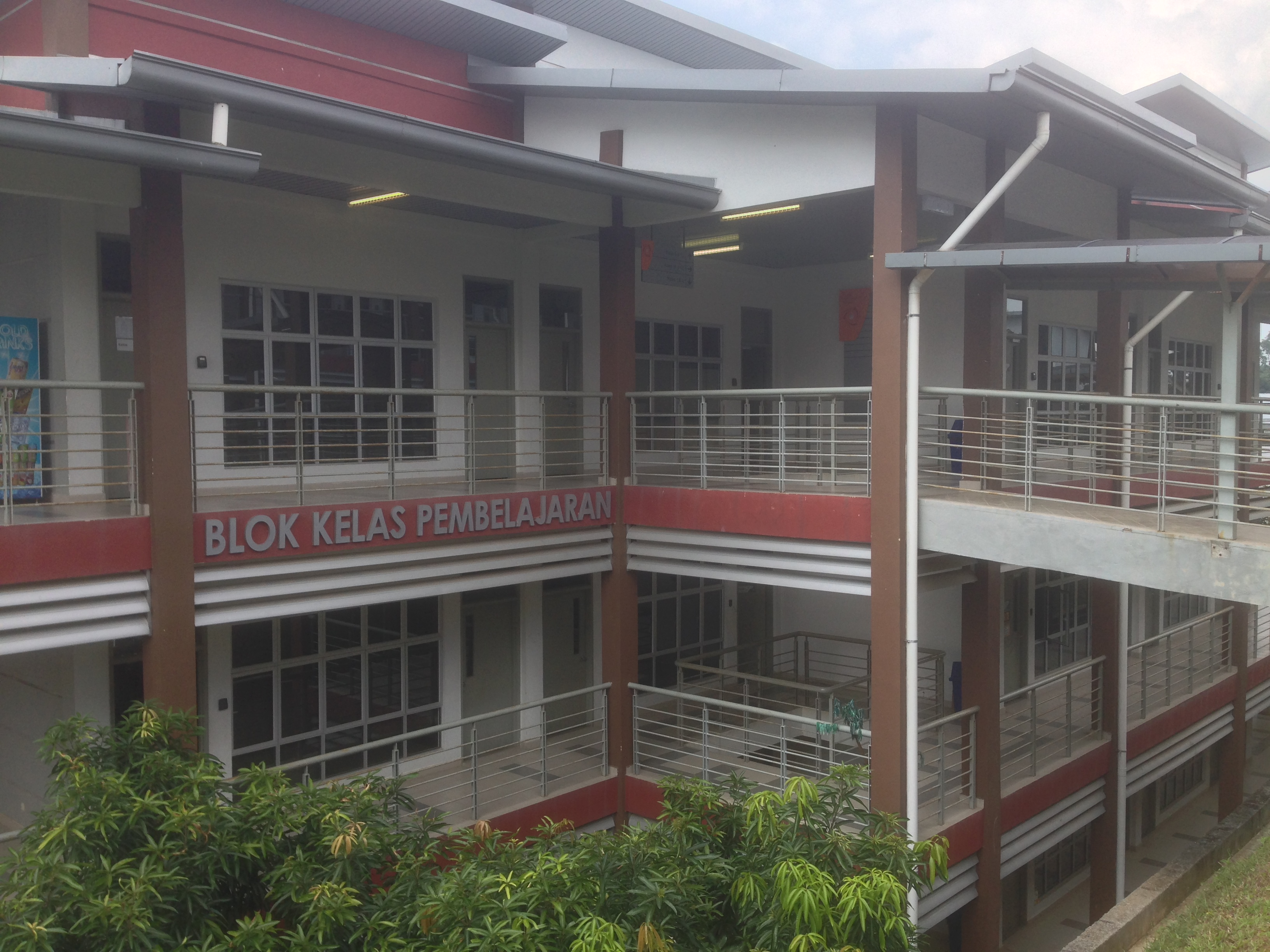
The classroom block of PERMATApintar was constructed in 2011 as a part of the second phase.

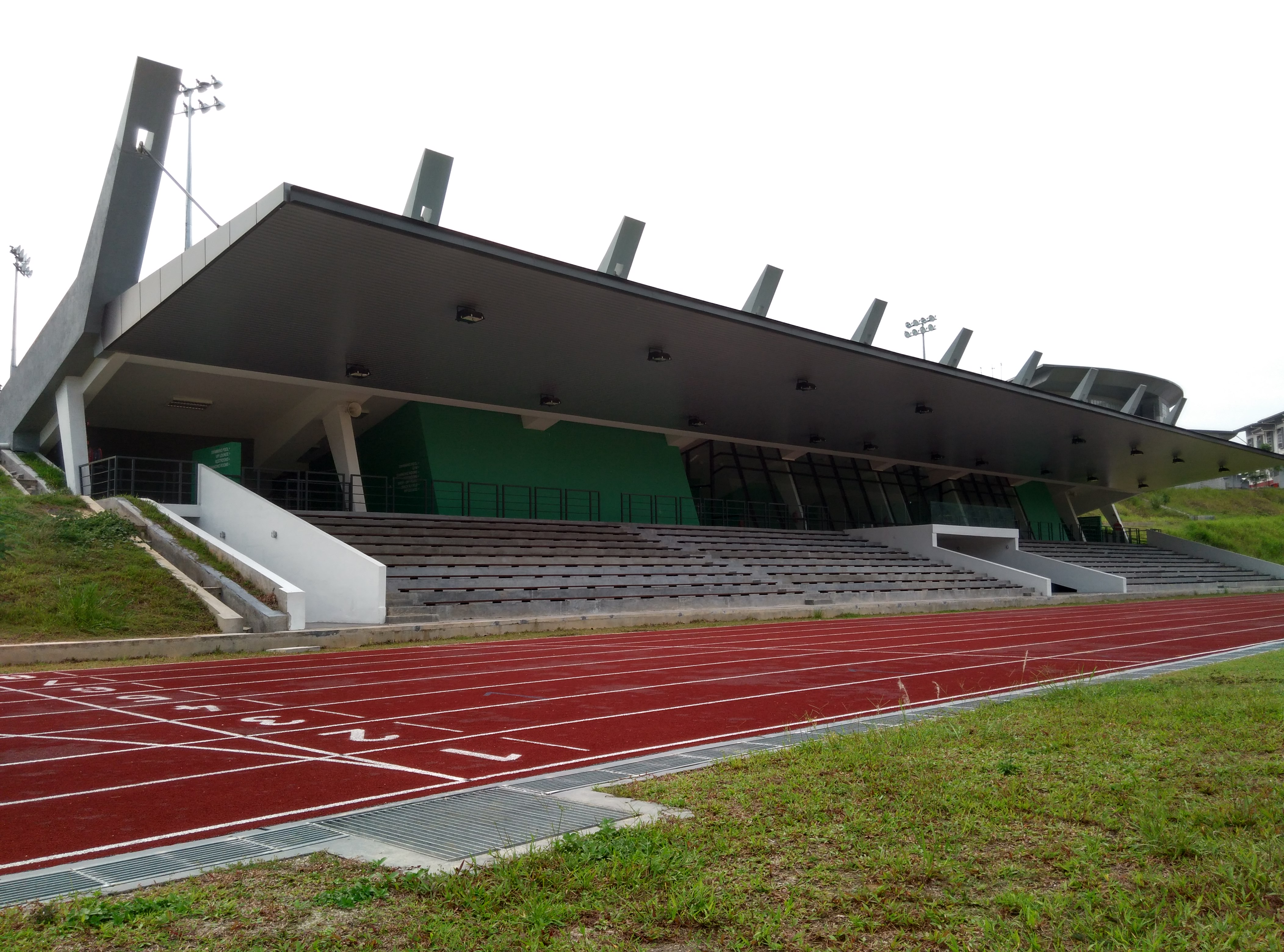
The sports complex of PERMATApintar was constructed in 2013 from a donation by Al-Bukhary Foundation.
