= Monterey Coast Preparatory School =

MCP Middle and High School (Monterey Coast Prep)

Location
- Scotts Valley, California; United States
- Coordinates: 37°04′03″N 121°59′51″W

Information
- Type: Private, Gifted Talented Learning Differences
- Established: 2010
- Closed: 2019
- Grades: 6-12
- Enrollment: approximately 24
- Average class size: 5-8
- Website: exploremcp.org

Monterey Coast Preparatory (MCP) Middle & High School was a private, independent middle and high school in Scotts Valley, California, United States. It focused on using a UDL-modified Universal Design for Learning curriculum for gifted & talented students, including those with learning differences such as ADHD, dyslexia, and autism spectrum disorders. Founded in 2010 by parents and teachers from another private school, its enrollment numbered thirty five total in 2018, with classes varying from 5 to 8 students each, in grades 6 through 12. The school utilized laptops, software, and assistive and adaptive technology for LD students.

The school announced its permanent closure in June 2019.

MCP began life as Empire Academy, a similarly formatted school which suddenly and unexpectedly closed its doors during the school year. Parents of students who were attending Empire banded together to form a new school, MCP becoming the result. After a brief stint in a location on Encinal street, they moved to Fern street after the discovery of mold in the previous building. Eventually, they would move to their final location, 125 Bethany Drive.

MCP Middle & High School requirements included a community service component. In 2009, 2010 and 2011, MCP students were awarded highest honors (the "Heavyweight" Award) for their donations to "Grind Out Hunger", a local program of Second Harvest Food Bank. Their 2010 contributions exceeded 20,000 pounds of food.

MCP was accredited by the Western Association of Schools and Colleges.
