= Mentiqa =

Type of school in Denmark

Mentiqa is a private school for highly gifted pupils in Denmark. It was founded by Pernille Buch-Rømer in 2004.

== History ==
In Denmark, congregated schools for highly gifted pupils occur only as private initiatives. Therefore, Mentiqa schools are private schools established and run by parents of highly gifted students. The first Mentiqa-school was established in Søborg, a suburb of Copenhagen, in 2004. Its founder, Pernille Buch-Rømer believed that schooling with like-minded children made it possible for highly gifted students to develop adequate social skills. The main focus of Mentiqa is to care for the well-being of its pupils, which is made possible through the acceptance of the highly gifted students' special behaviour and way of thinking, through inclusivity and differentiated teaching.

Mentiqa-Odense was established on Fyn in 2006 and closed in 2015, shortly before the first Mentiqa-school changed its name to Atheneskolen (the Athena School). Mentiqa-Nordjylland (Northern Jutland) was established in Ålborg in 2008, but no Mentiqa-school has been established since.

== See also ==
- Johnsen, Ståle (21 April 2016). "Stort engasjement omkring skole for evnerike barn". Utdanningsnytt (in Norwegian).
- Toft-Nielsen, Vibeke (4 February 2015). "Mentiqa: Skole for begavede elever lukker". Fyens Stiftstidende (in Danish).
- Medom Marcus, Thomas (28 April 2021). "Ikke lutter lagkage at være klog - nu vil Rune starte en ny skole". TV 2 (in Danish).
- Holbek, Berit (3 July 2011). "Da Kasper blev glad igen". Fyns Amts Avis (in Danish).
