= Polish Children's Fund =

Organisation's new logo

The old logo

The Polish Children's Fund (Polish: Krajowy Fundusz na rzecz Dzieci, KFnrD) is a Polish non-government organization which supports highly gifted schoolchildren. It was established in 1981 by Ryszard Rakowski and late Jan Szczepański.

The Polish Children's Fund organizes the national stage of the European Union Contest for Young Scientists.

== Scholarship programme ==
The Polish Children's Fund gives scholarships for pre-university students skilled in the sciences, humanities, musics or ballet. Every year around 550 children receive the scholarship. Instead of financial aid, KFnrD gives its participants unique opportunities to participate in lectures, workshops and research projects in cooperation with some of the most eminent scholars both from Poland and other European countries.

Most of the scientific camps are devoted to a single discipline and have its further qualification. They are organized by various institutions of the University of Warsaw, the Polish Academy of Sciences, Jagiellonian University and the Nicolaus Copernicus University in Toruń.

One of the central events is a general camp, which takes place in Serock (near Warsaw) from April to June (previous locations included Otwock and Jadwisin). The participants have opportunity to attend lectures and workshops related to their interests. Also, they take part in the activities not connected with any particular field of study: sport games, psychological workshops, movie projections, concerts, and meetings with intellectuals, often pertaining to profound themes of philosophy, religion and developing one's worldview.

During the summer the Polish Children's Fund scholars are sent to various scientific camps, including:

- Research Science Institute - a highly competitive research camp which takes place at the Massachusetts Institute of Technology,
- European Space Camp - astronomic camp in Lofoten, Norway,
- XLAB International Science Camp at the University of Göttingen,
- London International Youth Science Forum.

In 2014, Polish Children's Fund together with University of Warsaw and Copernicus Science Centre organises EUCYS finals, which are being held in Warsaw.

== See also ==
- Gifted education
- List of gifted and talented programmes
