= Northwestern University Center for Talent Development =

Service and research center at Northwestern University

Center for Talent Development

Information
- School type: courses and programs for advanced students
- Founded: 1982
- Founder: Joyce VanTassel-Baska
- Authority: Northwestern University
- Director: Susan Corwith
- Grades: age 3 to grade 12
- Classes offered: Mathematics, Computer Science, Humanities, and Science
- Accreditation: North Central Association Commission on Accreditation and School Improvement (NCA CASI)
- Website: www.ctd.northwestern.edu

Center for Talent Development (CTD), established in 1982, is a direct service and research center in the field of gifted education and talent development based at Northwestern University.

CTD offers in-person and online educational programs for students age 3 through grade 12, and resources for their families, and educators, including:

- Online enrichment, honors, and AP courses
- Service-learning and leadership programs
- Weekend and summer programs
- Assessment and consulting services, including above-grade-level assessment, through Northwestern University's Midwest Academic Talent Search
- Parent seminars
- Online communities for students and parents
- Program evaluation, professional development, and curriculum units for schools

CTD also works with the Jack Kent Cooke Foundation to support their scholarship programs, which are designed to advance the education of exceptionally promising students who have financial need.

== History ==
CTD began as a research and talent assessment program and soon after grew to include educational programs in several different forms. Dr. Joyce VanTassel-Baska, CTD's founder and former director, started the Midwest Talent Search Project at Northwestern University in 1982. LetterLinks, a distance education program (later known as Gifted LearningLinks), began the same year and transitioned from mail correspondence to online courses in 2002. Summer and weekend enrichment programs were launched in 1983. Northwestern University officially established the Center for Talent Development in 1984. In 1999, the Civic Education Project joined CTD, introducing service-learning, civic engagement, and leadership to the curriculum. The center has since added programs and services for families, educators, and schools.

CTD's current director, Dr. Paula Olszewski-Kubilius, has served in her role since 1987. She served as president of the National Association for Gifted Children from 2011 to 2013, from whom she received the Early Scholar Award in 1987, the Distinguished Scholar Award in 2009, and the Gifted Child Quarterly Paper of the Year Award in 2011. She received the Mensa Award for Excellence in Research in 2013. Olszewski-Kubilius has been interviewed by Education Week and The Boston Globe for her research in the field of gifted education and talent development. Her work has been published by the Association for Psychological Science, Prufrock Press, Scientific American, Roeper Review, Journal of Secondary Gifted Education, Asian Pacific Education Review, Parenting for High Potential, and Gifted Child Quarterly.

== Talent Search ==
Northwestern University's Midwest Academic Talent Search (commonly referred to as "NUMATS") is the above-grade-level assessment program within Northwestern University's Center for Talent Development. Originally called the Midwest Academic Talent Search (MATS), NUMATS was started in 1982 by Dr. Joyce VanTassel-Baska. This research-validated program aims to provide families and educators with insights into participants' academic strengths, measure growth, and help connect students with supplemental enrichment, accelerated programs, and appropriate school-based curricula and courses.

Above-grade-level assessments (using tests intended for older students) and interpretive information, such as that provided by NUMATS and similar talent search programs, give a more accurate measurement of aptitude than grade-level assessments for higher-achieving students, particularly for those students who are scoring at the highest end of their grade-level standardized assessments. NUMATS above-grade-level assessment is based on the work of Dr. Julian Stanley at Johns Hopkins University. Dr. Stanley was an advocate of accelerated education for academically advanced or gifted children. He founded the Center for Talented Youth at Johns Hopkins and initiated a related research project, the Study of Mathematically Precocious Youth (SMPY), which is an ongoing, longitudinal study of the talent development of individuals identified as gifted. Further research continues to support the model and explore its applications for identification, placement, and academic acceleration. Published in 2004, a report titled A Nation Deceived: How Schools Hold Back America's Brightest Students found above-level testing to be useful in identifying candidates for acceleration and eliminating the ceiling effect many high-ability students experience on grade-level tests.

Through NUMATS, students in grades 3 through 6 take the PSAT8/9 (a test designed for students in grades 8 and 9). Students in grades 6 through 9 may take the SAT and/or ACT (tests designed for students in grades 11 and 12).

=== Uses and Applications ===
Above-grade-level test results provide insights into academic abilities, can serve as a benchmark for growth, and help in predicting readiness for acceleration. They are also used to select courses and instruction matched to students' assessed abilities in their domains of talent (placement in services and appropriate instruction).

Above-grade-level assessments are also used by at the state level to identify gifted students (see Colorado and Ohio), and by researchers and in school-based programs to evaluate the efficacy of academic interventions aimed at gifted and advanced students. In 2017, a study of data collected from past talent search participants examined how demographics, educational experiences, and personal interest impacted the likelihood of pursuing a college degree in science, technology, engineering, or mathematics. The study found that experience in a talent search and supplemental gifted programs helped students intensify their interests in STEM. In 2019–2020, a program called Project OCCAMS (Online Curriculum Consortium for Accelerating Middle School) utilized above-grade-level testing to implement accelerated curriculum for bright underserved students in Columbus City Schools. Developed in collaboration with Northwestern University's Center for Talent Development, the Center for Gifted Education at the College of William & Mary, and Columbus City Schools, Project OCCAMS has been funded by the Jacob K. Javits Federal Grant Program and the Jack Kent Cooke Foundation.

=== Eligibility ===
Eligibility for NUMATS is determined by meeting grade-level assessment criteria in either verbal/reading or math on a nationally normed or state achievement test; past participation in above-grade-level testing; participation in a school gifted program or advanced academic services; or and/or recommendation by a parent or teacher. Students with scores at the 90th percentile or above in at least one category or subcategory on a state achievement test may also qualify for NUMATS.

== Developmental approach ==
Academic researchers and programs endorse different definitions of intellectual giftedness and approaches to gifted education. CTD's educational philosophy is based on the talent development model, a framework looking beyond IQ and emphasizing personal growth, the development of non-cognitive traits such as psychosocial skills, and the impact of the educational environment on student performance.

== Research ==
In addition to programs, the Center for Talent Development contributes research to the fields of talent development and gifted education. Notable publications include:

- 2016 – "What One Hundred Years of Research Says About the Effects of Ability Grouping and Acceleration on K–12 Students' Academic Achievement: Findings of Two Second-Order Meta-Analyses" synthesizes 100 years of research on the effects of ability grouping and acceleration on academic achievement, finding that students benefited from within-class grouping, cross-grade subject grouping, and special grouping for the gifted.
- 2015 – "Conceptualizations of Giftedness and the Development of Talent: Implications for Counselors" presents a historical perspective on giftedness and discusses the psychosocial issues and skills relevant to supporting the development of gifted students.
- 2012 – "Academically Gifted Students' Perceived Interpersonal Competence and Peer Relationships" documents how gifted students perceive their abilities to develop and maintain relationships with their peers.
- 2011 – "Rethinking Giftedness and Gifted Education: A Proposed Direction Forward Based on Psychological Science" promotes a new framework for understanding giftedness that emphasizes talent within domains and the importance of psychosocial skills.

== Affiliated organizations ==
Northwestern University School of Education and Social Policy

== See also ==
- Belin-Blank Center for Gifted Education and Talent Development
- Center for Talented Youth, Johns Hopkins University
- Western Academic Talent Search, CU Boulder
- Duke University Talent Identification Program (Academic Talent Search discontinued in 2020)
