= Choice School for the Gifted and Exceptional =

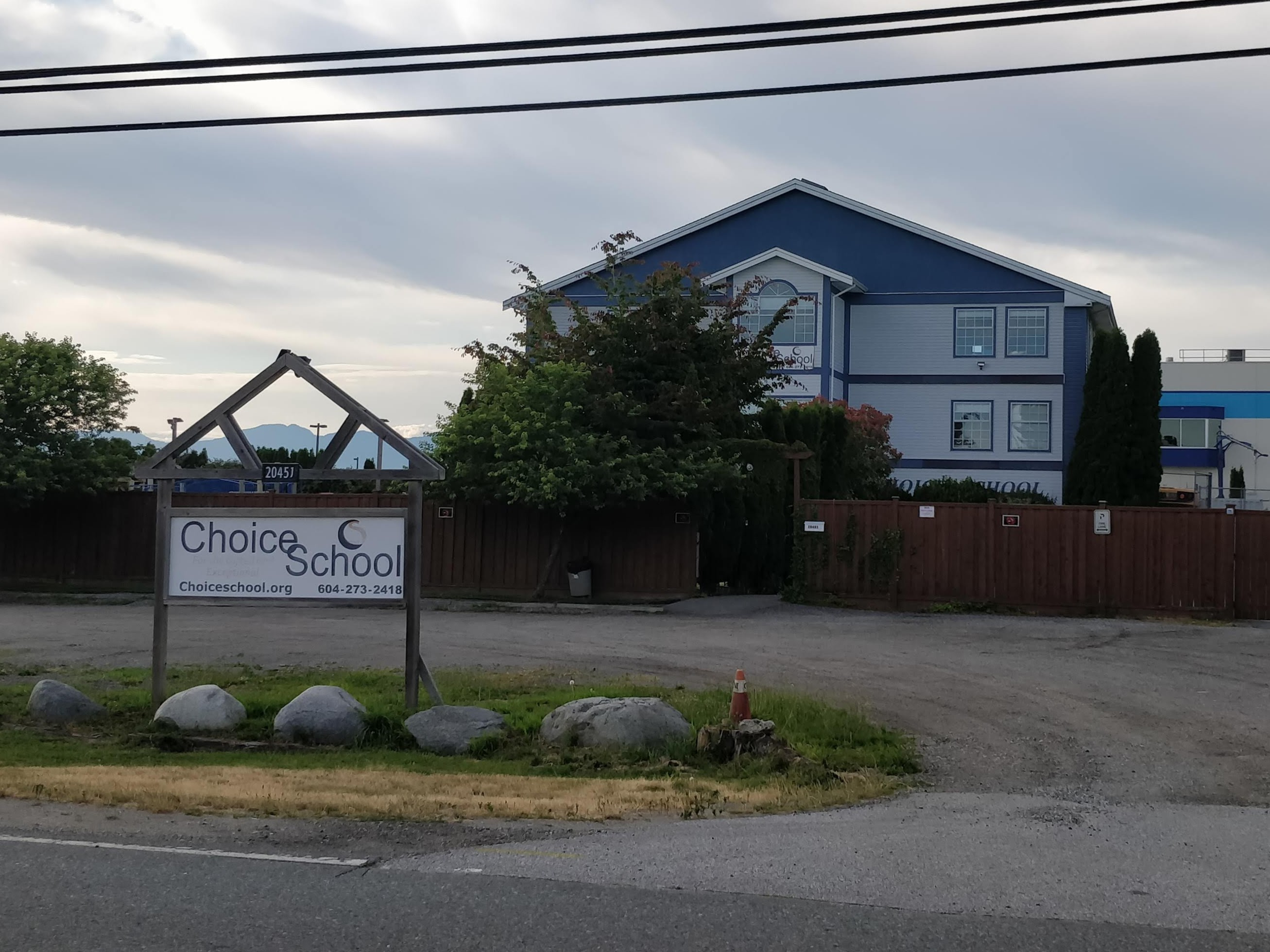

Location
- 20451 Westminster Hwy; Richmond, British Columbia, V6V 3A2; Canada
- 49.1704°N 122.9949°W

Information
- Opened: 1985
- Principal: Sukhbir Bolina
- Grades: pre K-9
- Language: English
- Website: choiceschool.org

The Choice School for the Gifted and Exceptional is an independent special education school in Richmond, British Columbia with a curriculum designed for gifted and twice exceptional children.

== History ==
Originally established in 1985, the school has maintained a focus on gifted education.

In 2016, the British Columbia Ministry of Education included Choice School in its list of "designated special education schools". Placement on this list grants the school access to Ministry of Education funding for extra student support.

== Elementary ==
In addition to the British Columbia core curriculum, students take part in enriched science, art, and music activities. The school also places a strong emphasis on regular physical activity. All students work with an Individual Education Plan, highlighting the students strengths and areas for further growth. Choice School currently offers pre-kindergarten to grade 8 classes. Class sizes are small and although students are typically grouped with their chronological peers, they can be advanced in accordance with their strengths.

== Middle school ==
In the fall of 2017 Choice School began offering a middle school program. This program will focus on supporting grades 7 through 9 and will be run separately from the elementary program that will support students from pre-kindergarten to grade 6.
