= Gifted Child Quarterly =

- Discipline: Education
- Language: English
- Edited by: Jennifer R. Cross

Publication details
- History: 1957-present
- Publisher: SAGE Publications
- Frequency: Quarterly
- Impact factor: 2.14 (2020)

Standard abbreviations
- ISO 4: Gift. Child Q.

Indexing
- ISSN: 0016-9862 (print); 1934-9041 (web)
- LCCN: 76644577
- OCLC no.: 3337727

Links
- Journal homepage

Gifted Child Quarterly is a peer-reviewed academic journal covering the field of education. The journal's editor-in-chief is Dr. Jennifer R. Cross from University of Louisiana at Lafayette, USA. The journal was established in 1957 and is published by SAGE Publications in association with the National Association for Gifted Children.

== Abstracting and indexing ==
The journal is abstracted and indexed in Scopus and the Social Sciences Citation Index. According to the Journal Citation Reports, its 2018 impact factor is 1.304, ranking it 41st out of 59 journals in the category "Psychology, Educational" and 24th out of 41 journals in the category "Education, Special".
