= Academy for Gifted Children =

Location
- 12 Bond Cres; Richmond Hill, Ontario, L4E 3K2; Canada

Information
- School type: Private high school and elementary school
- Motto: Keeping Pace
- Founded: 1993
- Status: Open
- Principal: Janice Gruchy
- Grades: 1–8
- Language: English
- Tuition: $17,500 – 21,500 CAD
- Website: www.pace.ca

The Academy for Gifted Children, known more commonly as P.A.C.E. (Programming for Academic and Creative Excellence) is a non-denominational primary school in Richmond Hill, Ontario, Canada founded by former teachers Dennis Reynolds & Barbara Rosenberg. Entrance is by a competitive examination called the WISC-V, or the Wechsler Intelligence Scale for Children. The school will permanently shut down on June 30, 2027.

== History ==
The school was founded in 1993 by former Earl Haig Secondary School teachers Dennis Reynolds & Barbara Rosenberg. It started off as a school for grades 1-8 with 25 students. It currently serves students from grades 1 through 8. Rosenberg remained as the "director" (the term used for the principal) until the end of the 2018–2019 school year, when the vice-principal at the time, Janice Gruchy replaced Rosenberg as the director.

== Overview ==
P.A.C.E., is a non-denominational coed private school in Oak Ridges. It has classes through grades 1-8. Since the removal of P.A.C.E's high school in September 2025, it no longer offers classes from grades 9-12.
