= The Schilling School for Gifted Children =

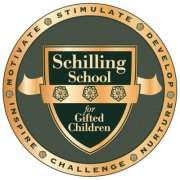
- School crest

Location
- 8100 Cornell Road; Cincinnati, Hamilton, Ohio 45249-2234; United States; 39°15′55″N 84°20′24″W

Information
- Type: Private, Coeducational, Special Program Emphasis
- Motto: "From those to whom much is given, much is expected"
- Religious affiliation: nonsectarian
- Established: 1997
- Founder: Dr. Sandra Schilling
- CEEB code: 361114
- NCES School ID: A9903482
- Head of school: Dr. Sandra Schilling
- Grades: K–12
- Colors: Green and Gold
- Sports: Aikido & Fencing Class/Team Fencing competes in Foil & Sabre in SOHFA (Southern Ohio High School Fencing Association) Sabre Division 1 Fencing Team placed 1st and was undefeated 2018
- Tuition: $15,000 (2015-16)
- Affiliation: OAGC; NAGC; OAIS
- Website: schillingschool.org

The Schilling School for Gifted Children is a K-12 private coeducational day school for gifted and talented students located in Cincinnati, Ohio. It was founded by Dr. Sandra Kelly Schilling in 1997.
