= Talnet =

Talnet o.s.
- Formation: 2003
- Region served: Czech rep. / Europe
- Website: talnet.info

Talnet is a Czech educational project that focuses on the development of gifted and motivated children. The mentioned project was established under the aegis of Charles University Prague and aims to educate extraordinarily gifted children in natural sciences. The theory is that talented children need individual treatment to identify themselves and develop their gifts. A program that would deal with these goals as needed. That's why the program Talnet creates a space on the online platform where its students could meet and discuss the topics they've found interesting. In addition, it creates a possibility to meet not only with the other Talnet students but also with the experts as well. Talnet Space – an online platform of Talnet communication – lets students and pupils connect in accordance with their goals and interests.

Talnet also develops a network among partners abroad and seeks other groups in the world, the aims of which are similar to Talnet's - the education of extraordinarily gifted students. The main effort is given to the students' meetings across boardings. Thus the meeting has two stages: at first, students explore online activities and learn communication; secondly, they meet each other at interesting places of the connected countries.

Talnet also aims at pupils', parents' and teachers' education. This way, Talnet helps them to find out the gift among all the pupils in the class and support them sufficiently. The organisation uses international knowledge and continues to participate in well-known contests and activities specially prepared for students with natural science interests. Talnet cooperates with a group of psychologists, who at the beginning and during the pupils' online study, watch the gifted young persons in their development and counsel their personal problems with them.

== What Talnet offers ==
"Talnet offers the whole structure of educational and exploring activities to children who are recommended by their teachers or psychologists. Activities differ in the topic, forms (face to face, blended, online) teaching approach, workload, complexity, and applicability. We prefer the active participation of children and youth in a rich learning environment according to the results of psycho-diagnostics tests. Since the beginning of the project we have confirmed that many gifted children need more and more challenging, e.g. demanding and complex, activities. The level of challenge may be perceived in many different aspects such as subject, problem-solving, creativity, production and social aspects, etc. The main purpose of international activities is offering gifted youth further opportunities for the development of their competencies and extending the offer of authentic educational and social activities."
