= Menlo Park Academy =

- Menlo Park Academy's logo

Location
- 2149 West 53rd St; Cleveland, (Cuyahoga County), Ohio 44102; United States; 41°28′23.6″N 81°43′14.5″W

Information
- Type: Gifted, Coeducational, Charter
- Opened: September 23, 2008
- Founder: Ms. Teri Harrison
- School district: CMSD
- Chairperson: Ms.Teri Harrison
- Dean: Jessica Wilcox
- Director: Deborah Zeffren
- Headmaster: Dr Michael Crudder
- Staff: Mr. Evans, Mr. Gross, etc.
- Grades: K-8
- Enrollment: 589
- Average class size: 20
- Colors: Blue and Orange
- Slogan: Developing the potential of gifted children
- Sports: Soccer, MFA, Gaga Ball
- Mascot: Wizard
- Nickname: MPA
- Team name: Wizards
- USNWR ranking: 1. 1 charter school in Ohio
- Yearbook: Yes
- Tuition: 600 per trimester
- Website: https://www.menloparkacademy.com

Menlo Park Academy is a school for children in grades K-8, in Cleveland, Ohio.

== History ==
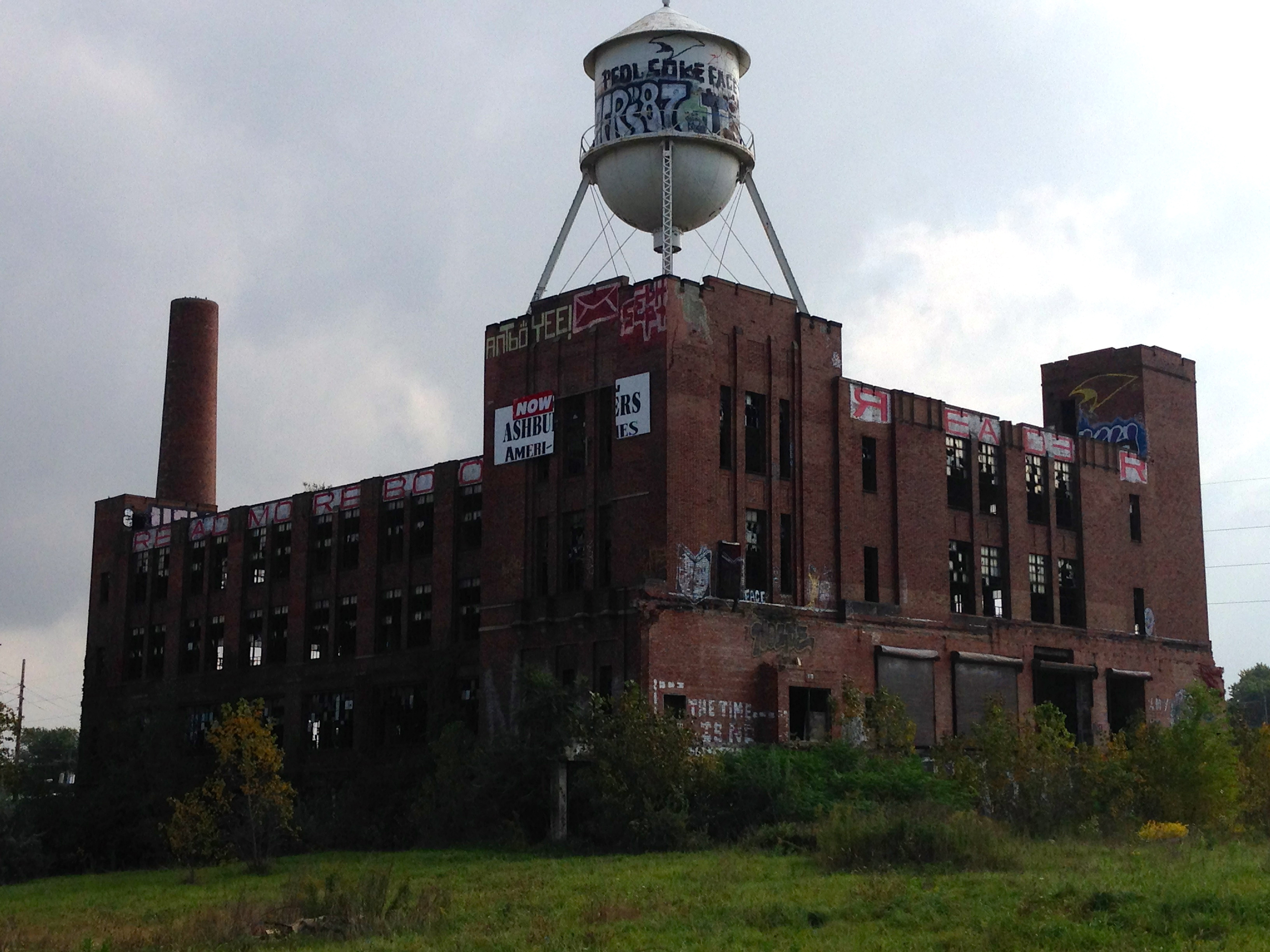
Abandoned Joseph and Feiss building.

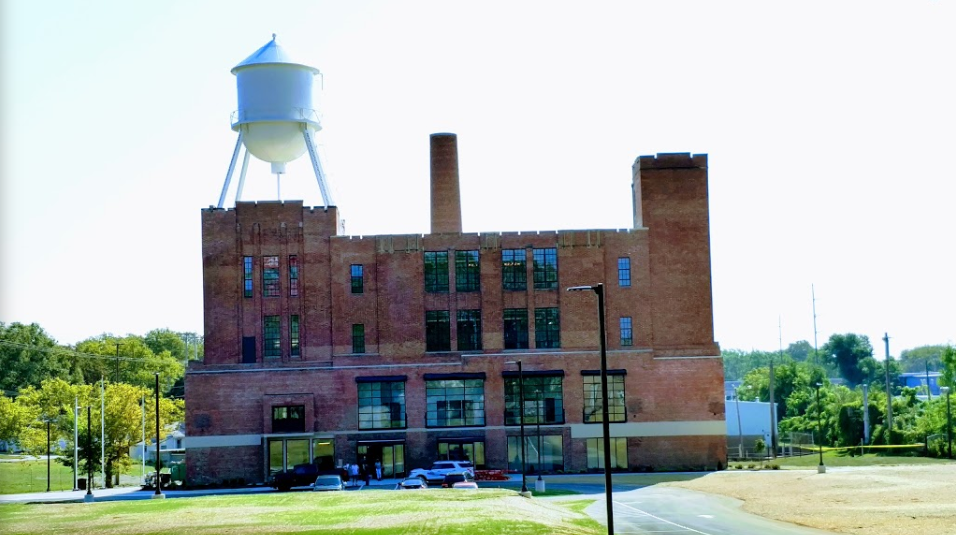
Menlo Park Academy's current building.

Menlo Park Academy was founded on September 23, 2008 with 38 students, and today enrolls nearly 500. The school has occupied three different buildings, currently situated in the Joseph and Feiss factory. The factory, which was previously abandoned, was renovated into the school it is today. Before the academy settled into its current building, the school was located at 14440 Triskett Road, next to St. Mel's.

== School rating ==
Menlo Park Academy was recently rated the #1 public K-8 school and #2 public charter elementary and middle school in Ohio by Niche. The overall niche grade was an A. In the categories, Teachers were given an A, Academics was given an A, but diversity was given an A−.

== Green Infrastructure Project ==
In 2023, Menlo Park secured a green infrastructure grant from the Northeast Ohio Regional Sewer District. While currently unfinished, the grant aims to renovate the "green", a playing field for recess. It will also add bioretention, permeable pavement, and infiltration practices to the area.

== Quiz Bowl Team ==
In 2022, Menlo Park Academy formed a quiz bowl team led by Jacob Kulas. Their first year was mainly uneventful, resulting in some mid-ranking tournament placings. However, in the 2023-2024 season, the team reached their peak. They gained their first tournament victory in January 2024, with the Comet Winter Clash. The Menlo Park Academy A-team claimed first place, with the B-team taking fourth in the elementary school division and the C-team taking 9th in the middle school division. Menlo Park's second victory came during the 10th Annual Copley Middle School Invitational. The Menlo Park A-Team took first, while the B-team took eighteenth. There was no C-team at this event. The team then secured a placing in the 2024 Ohio Middle School State Tournament, where they placed third. As of yet, they have had no tournaments in the 2024-2025 season.

=== Nationals ===
Due to their early victory in the Comet Winter Clash, Menlo Park Academy was able to secure a placing in the 2024 Middle School National Championships at the Hyatt hotel in Rosemond, neighboring Chicago. In this tournament, they placed 116th out of 160.
