= Science High School =

Schools named Science High School include:

== Located in South Korea ==
- Ulsan Science High School, Ulsan
- Changwon Science High School, Changwon
- Busan Il Science High School, Busan
- Busan Science High School, Busan
- Chungbuk Science High School, Cheongwon
- Changwon Science High School, Changwon
- Chungnam Science High School, Gongju
- Daegu Science High School, Daegu
- Daejeon Science High School, Daejeon
- Kangwon Science High School, Wonju
- Kyeongbuk Science High School, Pohang
- Gwangju Science High School, Gwangju
- Gyeonggi Science High School, Suwon
- Gyeonggibuk Science High School, Uijeongbu
- Gyeongnam Science High School, Jinju
- Gyeongsan Science High School, Gyeongsan
- Hansung Science High School, Seoul
- Incheon Science High School, Incheon
- Jeju Science High School, Jeju City
- Jeonnam Science High School, naju
- Jeonbuk Science High School, Iksan
- Jeonnam Science High School, Naju
- Korea Science Academy of KAIST, Busan
- Sejong Science High School, Seoul
- Seoul Science High School, Jongno-gu, Seoul

== Located in the Philippines ==
- Philippine Science High School (various campuses)
- Regional Science High School (various campuses)
- ESEP High Schools (various public or private science high schools)

== Located in Turkey ==
- Adana Science High School, Adana
- Aksaray Science High School, Aksaray
- Kültür Private Science High School, Bakırköy
- Akşehir Science High School, Akşehir
- Ankara Science High School, Ankara
- Ankara Private Bilfen Çayyolu Science High School, Ankara
- Ankara Mustafa Hakan Güvençer Science High School, Ankara
- Ankara Polatlı TOBB Science High School, Ankara
- Ankara Pursaklar Science High School, Ankara
- Aydın Science High School, Aydın
- Nazilli Science High School, Aydın
- Nilüfer İMKB Science High School, Bursa
- Çanakkale Science High School, Çanakkale
- Erbakır Science High School, Denizli
- Kaya Karakaya Science High School, Elazığ
- Gaziantep Science High School, Gaziantep
- Halil Kale Science High School, Turgutlu
- İzmir Science High School, İzmir
- Kirikkale Science High School, Kırıkkale
- Konya Meram Science High School, Konya
- Giresun Science High School, Giresun
- Malatya Science High School, Malatya
- Adana Eczacı Bahattin-Sevinç ERDİNÇ Science High School, Ceyhan
- Bucak Adem Tolunay Science High School, Bucak, Burdur
- Gundoğdu Private Science High School, Adana
- Kahramanmaras TOBB Science High School, Kahramanmaras
- Manisa Science High School, Manisa
- Atatürk High School of Science, Istanbul
- İzmir Özel Türk Science High School, İzmir
- İzmir Özel Fatih Science High School, İzmir
- Mersin 75th Year Science High School, Mersin
- Edirne Science High School, Edirne
- Aziz Atik Science High School, Samsun
- Trabzon Yomra High School of Science, Trabzon
- Seval-Ahmet Çetin Science High School, Tekirdağ
- İbrahim Süheyla İzmirli Science High School, Zonguldak
- Tofaş Science High School, Bursa
- Eyüp Aygar Science High School, Mersin
- TÜBİTAK Science High School, Gebze
- Cumhuriyet Science High School, Diyarbakır

== Located in the United States ==
- Bronx High School of Science, New York City
- Science Park High School (New Jersey), Newark, New Jersey
