= Elite League (TV series) =

South Korean television reality show

- Promotional poster for season 1
- Hangul: 대학 전쟁
- Hanja: 大學 戰爭
- Lit.: University War
- RR: Daehak jeonjaeng
- MR: Taehak chŏnjaeng
- Genre: variety show; reality competition
- Written by: Kim Jeong-seon; Kwon Young
- Directed by: Heo Beom-hun; Kim In-ji
- Presented by: Hwang In-seong
- Narrated by: Shim Hye-rin (S1); Lee Da-seul (S2)
- Country of origin: South Korea
- Original language: Korean
- No. of seasons: 3
- No. of episodes: 24 (list of episodes)

Production
- Production company: MBN

Original release
- Network: Coupang Play
- Release: November 3, 2023 – January 23, 2026

Elite League (Korean: 대학 전쟁) is a South Korean reality game show where students from prestigious universities in South Korea and abroad battle to solve brain quizzes. The first season premiered on November 3, 2023 on Coupang Play. The second season premiered on November 15, 2024 on Coupang Play. The third season premiered on December 12, 2025.

== Concept ==
The main concept of this television series features student representatives from several universities in South Korea. This event will test participants' abilities in mathematics, deduction and memorization which are packaged in the form of challenges. The participants perform missions of unprecedented difficulty, including mental arithmetic and arithmetic, reasoning and games, and superhuman memorization, and fight against each other without politics, betrayal, alliances, or deception, using only their brains and risking everything.

The full rules of the game are not announced in advance. In other words, after the first round, participants can know the full rules. This reality show applies the concept of elimination for any team that cannot complete the challenge and provide the correct answer. The introductory image of the eliminated team is shredded just before exit.

One round of college wars consists of an ace selection match, an ace match, a main match, and a death match. In season 2, ace selection match and ace match was replaced with benefit match.

- Ace Selection Match: Players from all surviving teams participate, and one person per team is selected as the ace (representative) on a first-come, first-served basis.
- Ace Match: The top player in the selection match nominates one of the other team's aces to play a 1:1 game. The winning team will receive a benefit that can be used in the main match. Benefit information is revealed after the explanation of the main match rules.
- Benefit Match: Players from all surviving teams participate will compete, and the best participant is determined through various problem-solving skills. The winning team will receive a benefit that can be used in the main match.
- Main Match: Players from all surviving teams participate, and all teams except the bottom two survive and advance to the next round.
- Death Match: The bottom two teams in the main match play will face the death match. The winning team advances to the next round, and the losing team becomes the final eliminated team of that round.

The finals will consist of a total of three main matches only, and the team that wins two rounds first will be the winner. In Season 1, the final winning university team will be provided with a scholarship of 10 million won per person, for a total of 40 million won. In Seasons 2 and 3, the final winning university will be provided with a scholarship of 20 million won per person, for a total of 80 million won.

== Contestants ==
For season 1, there are 5 teams with 4 students each representing various university. They will compete against each other in various rounds and questions to test their intelligence. The contestants are selected from among students at Seoul National University, Korea Advanced Institute of Science and Technology, Pohang University of Science and Technology, Yonsei University, and Korea University through a rigorous pre-test. In the second round after a team got eliminated, Korean or American-Korean students from Harvard University joined the show. In other words, there are actually a total of 6 participating teams and 24 participants.

List of contestants in Season 1, showing university, major, and notes
University	Contestant	Major	Notes
Seoul National University	Kyung Do-hyun	Economics '23	Admission to Seoul National University's College of Social Sciences; 4th place in the nation with 1 mistake in the CSAT
Seoul National University	Park Hyun-min	Psychology '23	Seoul National University after studying for one year; All A+
Seoul National University	Song Hyun-seok	Electrical and Information Engineering '22	Simultaneous admission to Seoul National University & KAIST; 2nd place overall at Hansung Science High School
Seoul National University	Jung Hyun-bin	Pre-Med '21	Perfect score on the CSAT; From Seoul National University Dental School to Seoul National University School of Medicine
KAIST	So Hyun-ji	Technology Management '20	KAIST official ambassador; Future social entrepreneur
KAIST	Yang Joon-hyuk	Mathematical Sciences '20	KAIST Presidential Scholarship recipient; Gold prize from international mathematics tournament
KAIST	Choi Seo-yeon	Electrical and Electronic Engineering '20	No. 1 in the whole school throughout high school; Quick and lively 4-dimensional brain
KAIST	Heo Sung-bum	Computer Science '19	Korea Science Academy for Gifted Students' honor student; Perfect score on pre-test memorization
POSTECH	Moon So-yul	Engineering '23	College of Engineering Beauty; Brain of science / Emotion of liberal arts
POSTECH	Shin Jae-yoon	Physics '20	Presidential Science Scholar; Science Award Collector
POSTECH	Shin Min-sub	Computer Engineering '19	Simultaneously accepted to Pohang University of Science and Technology & KAIST; Senior in Computer Engineering
POSTECH	Lee Hyun-soo	Chemical Engineering '20	IQ 152; Pohang University of Science and Technology Cheerleader
Yonsei University	Kim Ki-hong	Pharmacy '23	Yonsei University Visual; Entered Pharmacy School as County Governor
Yonsei University	Park Na-yoon	Pre-Dentistry '22	Scholarship student at Yonsei Dental School; Relieve stress through studying!
Yonsei University	Son Ju-hyung	Mechanical Engineering '22	A+ in all subjects; A man crazy about aerospace
Yonsei University	Cho Hyun-jun	Pre-Dentistry '22	The only person with a perfect score in the pre-test; Hobby is mental calculation
Korea University	Kim Jung-min	Business Administration '22	Brain game enthusiast; Business student who is serious about math
Korea University	Lee Dong-kyu	Mathematics '19	Future Fields Medal; The man crazy about math
Korea University	Lee Ji-soo	Physics '23	Queen of Physics; Both brains and sense
Korea University	Chae Seung-min	Statistics '21	60 high school awards; All-rounder for both studying and exercising
Harvard University	David Kwak	Mathematics '19	Math genius violinist; Innate mathematical sense
Harvard University	Janice Nam	Applied Mathematics and Sociology '20	Chairman of Harvard University's Korean Club; Leader with gentle charisma
Harvard University	Ray Noh	Mechanical Engineering '21	Future washing machine developer; Brain game enthusiast
Harvard University	Sky Jung	Computer Science '21	Coding genius; Prospective startup founder

List of contestants in Season 2, showing university, major, and notes
University	Contestant	Major	Notes
Seoul National University	Jo Jun-hyeong	Dentistry '24	Innate Math DNA; Selected Physics II and Chemistry II in CSAT
Seoul National University	Kim Gyu-min	Mathematical Sciences '24	1st place overall in pre-test; Early admission to Seoul Science High School
Seoul National University	Yook Jun-hyeong	Pre-Med '23	Admission to Seoul National University without private education; 2 mistakes in CSAT
Seoul National University	Woo Soo-han	Electrical and Information Engineering '24	2nd place overall in pre-test; Geoje Island genius
KAIST	Park Ji-sung	Electrical and Electronic Engineering '23	Abandoned Seoul National University for KAIST; Double-digit multiplication mental calculation in 4 seconds
KAIST	Oh Hyung-seok	Computer Science '23	Chose KAIST instead of medical school; 5 mistakes in CSAT
KAIST	Choi Yu-chan	Semiconductor Systems Engineering '23	Winner of all subjects at Incheon Science High School Contest; Scholarship student of Semiconductor System Engineering Department
KAIST	Hwang Gi-hyeon	Chemistry '22	Busan Science High School ranked 1st in mathematics; Abandoned POSTECH for KAIST
POSTECH	Jeon Ji-sung	Semiconductor Engineering '24	Abandoned Seoul National University and KAIST for Pohang University of Science and Technology; 1st place in Korea at the International Robot Olympiad
POSTECH	Choi Jin-hyeon	Electronic and Electrical Engineering '23	Pohang University of Science and Technology Memorization Robot; Exemplary Award for Science High School Graduates
POSTECH	Ha Min-su	Mathematics '20	From 150th place in the whole school to 10th place; Steel mentality
POSTECH	Lee Ju-yeong	Engineering '24	Gangwon Science High School Representative in Scholarship Quiz; Gangwon Science High School Physics 1st place overall
Yonsei University	Park Se-hwan	Pre-Dentistry '24	3rd place overall in pre-test; 1st place overall at Gyeonggibuk Science High School
Yonsei University	Yang Hyeon-seung	Medicine '22	Daejeon Science High School ranked highest in grades; International Mathematics Tournament Bronze Prize
Yonsei University	Lee Seung-chan	System Semiconductor Engineering '22	Recipient of Korea Talent Award; National Representative for International Science and Technology Competition
Yonsei University	Im Jeong-hoon	Urban Engineering '24	Gwangju Science High School math genius; Memorized up to 440 digits of pi
Korea University	Kang Ra-el	Pre-Med '23	Korea Science Academy of KAIST TOP 6; Chose Korea University instead of KAIST; Chemistry, Mathematics, and Physics Olympiad Winner
Korea University	Seo Ha-eun	Industrial and Management Engineering '22	Admission to Korea University without private education; Strategy game mania
Korea University	Lee Hyeon-seung	Medicine '20	3rd place in the entire Sejong Science High School; Korea University Son Suk-ku
Korea University	Choi Seong-hyeon	Fusion Energy Engineering '22	GPA 4.36; Hexagon All-Rounder
Oxford University	Choi Won-jin (Sunny Choi)	Engineering '22	Top 5% in American Mathematics Competitions; Oxford's Min Hyo-rin
Oxford University	Ha Eun (Eun Hah)	Mathematics & Computer Engineering '23	Presidential Science Scholarship; Abandoned Seoul National University's computer science for Oxford
Oxford University	Lee Seung-chan (Kevin Lee)	Philosophy, Politics & Economics '21	1st place with perfect score in Oxford entrance exam; 1st place in Korea at World Robotics Competition
Oxford University	Jang Moon-hyeok (Joshua Chang)	Computer Science & Philosophy '22	Many awards from international mathematics competitions; Oxford Korean Association President
MIT	Heo Seo-yoon (Kelly Heo)	Biotechnology '22	Graduated from a prestigious American high school; An MIT paramedic who dreams of becoming a doctor
MIT	Lee Da-eun (Catherine Lee)	Computer Engineering & Economics '22	SAT 1600 perfect score; pre-test memorization perfect score
MIT	Park Min-seok (Eli Park)	Computer Engineering '23	Top 1% in American Mathematics Competitions; Has a perfect GPA in MIT
MIT	Jeon Hyeon-woo (Daniel Jeon)	Physics '23	American Physics Olympiad Gold Medal; Three gold medals from prestigious American universities

List of contestants in Season 3, showing university, major, and notes
Division	University	Contestant	Major	Notes
STEM	Seoul National University	Kim Gang-hyun	Industrial Engineering '21	Korea Informatics Olympiad Winner; Top 0.6% in Chess.com
STEM	Seoul National University	Han Jong-yun	Physics and Astronomy '24	International Physics Olympiad gold medalist; All A+
STEM	Seoul National University	Kim Dong-geon	Mathematical Sciences '25	International on Astronomy and Astrophysics gold medalist; Presidential Science Scholarship recipient
STEM	Seoul National University	Song Myung-soo	Energy Resources Engineering '25	1st place in Math at Daegu Science High School for the Gifted; Research competition Awardee
STEM	KAIST	Kang Ji-hoo	Mathematics '22	KAIST Presidential Scholarship Student; runner up in international chess competition
STEM	KAIST	Kim Jae-han	Freshman Course '25	Gyeongsan Science High School 1st place in Math; 10th Place in Mathematics among KAIST Freshmen
STEM	KAIST	Kim Ji-woo	Freshman Course '25	Minister of Science and IST awardee; KAIST Admission Scholarship Student
STEM	KAIST	Jeon Ji-min	Semiconductor Systems Engineering '22	Samsung Scholarship Student; Priority selection of Korea Science Academy of KAIST
STEM	POSTECH	Hwang Seok-hun	Mathematics '24	highest number of thesis contributions among high school students in South Korea; 1st place in Math at Daejeon Science High School; Presidential Science recipient
STEM	POSTECH	Je Seung-gyu	Industrial and Management Engineering '24	A+ in Graduate Course
STEM	POSTECH	Lee Jun-woo	Computer Science '24	highest IQ at Gyeonggibuk Science High School; brain teasers maniac
STEM	POSTECH	Park Seo-yeon	Engineering '25	5th place in National High School Coding Contest; 6th place graduate from Hanmin High School
Medicine	Seoul National University	Lee Seung-hyun	Pre-Med '25	Perfect score in 2025 CSAT; International Physics Olympiad Gold Medalist; 1st place overall in Seoul Science High School
Medicine	Seoul National University	Han Seo-yeon	Pre-Med '24	1st Place in Hankuk Academy of Foreign Studies for 3 years; Won a silver medal in Korean Mathematical Olympiad for High School students while in middle school
Medicine	Seoul National University	Kim Min-seok	Dentistry '23	Top student in Math at Dankook University High School; Hobby is solving Mensa Problems
Medicine	Seoul National University	Joo Min-seo	Dentistry '25	Entered and passed SNU twice; Attended science high school at 14
Medicine	Yonsei University	Park Sang-yeon	Medicine '22	1st place in Seoul Science High School; International Physics Olympiad gold medalist; Devil's Plan Season 2 Contestant
Medicine	Yonsei University	Choi A-in	Pre-Med '25	Top student at Sejong Science High School; Only had 2 wrong answers in CSAT
Medicine	Yonsei University	Lee Chung-seo	Dentistry '25	1st place in Math at Sejong Science High School; Chemistry Competition gold medalist
Medicine	Yonsei University	Lee Yun-beom	Dentistry '25	Beat 149 students in a Math Essay; 2nd place in Math at Whimoon High School
Medicine	Sungkyunkwan University	Kang Ji-hoo	Pre-Med '25	3rd place overall in Hansung Science High School; 1st place in pre-test
Medicine	Sungkyunkwan University	Sung Tae-hoon	Medicine '22	International Neuroscience Olympiad
Medicine	Sungkyunkwan University	Kim Dong-yeon	Medicine '22	1st Place in Bugil Academy
Medicine	Sungkyunkwan University	Lee Dong-jae	Pre-Med '23	Korean Mathematical Olympiad gold medalist; Early admission in Seoul Science High School

== Episodes ==
Season	Episodes	Originally released	
Season	Episodes	First released	Last released
1	8	November 3, 2023	December 15, 2023
2	8	November 15, 2024	December 27, 2024
3	8	December 12, 2025	January 23, 2026

No. overall	No. in season	Title	Running time	Original release date
Season 1
1	1	"0.1%"	1 hour 10 minutes	November 3, 2023
Students from Korea's most prestigious universities gathered to determine their true ranking, putting the school's honor on the line. NO politics, NO coalition. All you need in this war is brains.
2	2	"The Rival"	1 hour 6 minutes	November 3, 2023
The survival team for the first main match among the Circapo Association will be revealed. Between survival and elimination, the first eliminated team was finally revealed amidst a fierce battle with two universities that met in a death match.
3	3	"World-class"	1 hour 3 minutes	November 10, 2023
The emergence of the world's most prestigious university. The dawn of a new war begins. Participants welcomed the second day with a sense of tension due to the larger scale. Who has the best reasoning ability?
4	4	"Mixed Signal"; Transliteration: "eotgallin sigeuneol" (Korean: 엇갈린 시그널)	58 minutes	November 17, 2023
Mixed signals, and a fatal mistake. In an unpredictable game, the shocking results of the second main match are revealed. What is the second university you will leave base camp for?
5	5	"God's Move"; Transliteration: "sin-eui han su" (Korean: 신의 한 수)	1 hour 10 minutes	November 24, 2023
The first alliance showdown in 'University Wars'! The main match with a twist filled with cheers and tears is revealed. Which team will the goddess of victory favor?
6	6	"Relay Match" (Korean: 릴레이 매치)	1 hour 13 minutes	December 1, 2023
The results of the death match between Yonsei University and Korea University will be revealed. It's finally time to decide which team will advance to the finals. Now, a 1:1 winner-take-all relay match begins where each individual must show off their abilities.
7	7	"Sure-win Strategy"; Transliteration: "philseung jeonryak" (Korean: 필승 전략)	1 hour 9 minutes	December 8, 2023
The start of the final main match with a ticket to the finals at stake. The fate of the university, which is changed by a single point, and the final death match to advance to the finals are revealed.
8	8	"Sequence Arrangement"; Transliteration: "seoyeol jeongni" (Korean: 서열 정리)	1 hour 30 minutes	December 15, 2023
The long-awaited final match has begun. An unprecedented final that requires all abilities including calculation, strategy, and spatial awareness. Which university will ultimately win the title of 'No. 1 university'?
Season 2
9	1	"No.1"	1 hour 21 minutes	November 15, 2024
A 100% pure cerebral survival game played with the honor of each university at stake. Pick a new rank. Participants with stronger brains were more likely to A fierce and thrilling battle of brains begins.
10	2	"Endless Competition"; Transliteration: "muhan gyeongjaeng" (Korean: 무한 경쟁)	1 hour 2 minutes	November 15, 2024
The puzzle is slowly being put together, the university that will win first is revealed, and the death match to determine the first team to be eliminated has begun.
11	3	"Pyramid Game" (Korean: 피라미드 게임)	1 hour 6 minutes	November 22, 2024
The second deathmatch of death begins. The dice are rolled to determine the fate of the two teams, and only one team is determined to return to base camp alive. The ongoing brain war, which university will rise to the top in the pyramid game?
12	4	"Perfect CSAT Score"; Transliteration: "suneung manjeom" (Korean: 수능 만점)	1 hour 16 minutes	November 29, 2024
The highest-ever CSAT that embarrassed even the top 0.1% geniuses is being held. In a desperate situation with no answer in sight, which university will receive the lowest score and go straight to the death match?
13	5	"Odds of Success"; Transliteration: "seungbusu" (Korean: 승부수)	1 hour 2 minutes	December 6, 2024
Two teams meet in a death match, one move that will make them happy or sad. The third team to leave the base camp is decided. In a match where each team's pride is at stake, who will get the benefit in a game where the future is unpredictable?
14	6	"Black and White" (Korean: 블랙 앤 화이트)	1 hour 1 minute	December 13, 2024
From yesterday's enemy to today's comrade, the long-awaited alliance match begins. Become a horse on the game board and lead your team to victory. A series of breathtaking psychological warfare and unpredictable developments. Which coalition will achieve victory?
15	7	"Game Changer" (Korean: 게임 체인저)	1 hour 16 minutes	December 20, 2024
The alliance collapsed and they turned into enemies. A death match begins with survival at stake. Which university will advance to the semi-finals?
16	8	"Last Puzzle"; Transliteration: "majimak pheojeul" (Korean: 마지막 퍼즐)	2 hours	December 27, 2024
In Season 2 of University War, a new ranking is organized. The only university that overcomes extreme difficulty and rises to the top. Who will enjoy the honor of winning the final championship?
Season 3
17	1	"Medical vs Science and Engineering" (Korean: 메디컬 vs 이공계)	1 hour 28 minutes	December 12, 2025
Medical vs. STEM, each field's pride on the line as they clash. The contestants have become stronger and the game has become more exciting. The curtain rises on a new, extreme battle of wits.
18	2	"Division"; Transliteration: "bunyeol" (Korean: 분열)	1 hour 30 minutes	December 12, 2025
After endless mining and investment, the winning lineage is revealed, and matches between the losing lines begin. Which team will be eliminated first?
19	3	"Variable"; Transliteration: "byeonsu" (Korean: 변수)	1 hour 11 minutes	December 19, 2025
Exit strategy 3: Fighting with your own words. The newly added hunter words eliminate the opponent's words, leading to a more intense strategic battle.
20	4	"Riddle"; Transliteration: "susukkekki" (Korean: 수수께끼)	1 hour 24 minutes	December 26, 2025
The first death match will determine the fate of three medical teams. Unravel a seemingly insurmountable puzzle. After a fierce battle for survival, who will be the second team to be eliminated from the University War?
21	5	"Last Chance"	1 hour 39 minutes	January 2, 2026
A showdown for the pride of the science and engineering community unfolds. A brain-dead match combining memory and numbers. Which team will survive this unpredictable melee?
22	6	"Dilemma" (Korean: 딜레마)	1 hour 22 minutes	January 9, 2026
The medical vs. science/engineering war has come to a close, and the real battle for each university's honor begins. After a semifinal round of highly strategic and meticulous psychological warfare, the top three will be determined.
23	7	"Perspective"; Transliteration: "tusi" (Korean: 투시)	1 hour 38 minutes	January 16, 2026
After a fierce deduction battle, the team that advances directly to the finals is determined. This is followed by a death match of overwhelming difficulty. Through this extreme game, requiring memorization, mental calculation, and even strategy, the finalists are determined.
24	8	"Checkmate" (Korean: 체크메이트)	2 hours and 6 minutes	January 23, 2026
The long-awaited finals. Between the two teams that fought a fiercely contested battle, which university will ultimately claim the championship and preserve its reputation?

== Game Summary ==
Game Summary of Season 1
Day		Ace Selection			Ace Match		Main Match			Death Match	
#	Ep.	Game	Ace(s)		Game	Winner	Game	Winner		Game	Winner
1	1 – 2	Electronic Brain	SNU	Jung Hyun-bin	Primary Number Check	Jung Hyun-bin	300	YONSEI		Formula Archery	KAIST
1	1 – 2	Electronic Brain	POSTECH	Shim Min-sub	Primary Number Check	Jung Hyun-bin	300	KU		Formula Archery	KAIST
1	1 – 2	Electronic Brain	KU	Chae Seung-min	Primary Number Check	Jung Hyun-bin	300	SNU		Formula Archery	KAIST
1	1 – 2	Electronic Brain	YONSEI	Park Na-yoon	Primary Number Check	Jung Hyun-bin	300	KAIST	POSTECH	Formula Archery	KAIST
1	1 – 2	Electronic Brain	KAIST	Heo Sung-bum	Primary Number Check	Jung Hyun-bin	300	KAIST	POSTECH	Formula Archery	KAIST
2	3 – 4	Perfect Number	YONSEI	Kim Ki-hong	Balance Game	Janice	Investigation Signal	SNU		Pixel Number	YONSEI
2	3 – 4	Perfect Number	KAIST	So Hyun-ji	Balance Game	Janice	Investigation Signal	KU		Pixel Number	YONSEI
2	3 – 4	Perfect Number	KU	Lee Dong-kyu	Balance Game	Janice	Investigation Signal	HARVARD		Pixel Number	YONSEI
2	3 – 4	Perfect Number	SNU	Song Hyun-seok	Balance Game	Janice	Investigation Signal	YONSEI	KAIST	Pixel Number	YONSEI
2	3 – 4	Perfect Number	HARVARD	Janice	Balance Game	Janice	Investigation Signal	YONSEI	KAIST	Pixel Number	YONSEI
3	5 – 6	Birth Date	YONSEI	Kim Ki-hong	Blind Omok	Jung Hyun-bin	Silent Human Chess	HARVARD	SNU	Match & Mix	KU
3	5 – 6	Birth Date	SNU	Jung Hyun-bin	Blind Omok	Jung Hyun-bin	Silent Human Chess	HARVARD	SNU	Match & Mix	KU
3	5 – 6	Birth Date	HARVARD	Ray	Blind Omok	Jung Hyun-bin	Silent Human Chess	HARVARD	SNU	Match & Mix	KU
3	5 – 6	Birth Date	KU	Lee Ji-soo	Blind Omok	Jung Hyun-bin	Silent Human Chess	HARVARD	SNU	Match & Mix	KU
4	6 – 7	Trail of Dice	All (SNU, KU, HARVARD)		Relay Match	SNU	Find Me	KU		Rotation! Rock Paper Scissors	SNU
5	8						Formula Safe	SNU			
5	8						Exit Strategy	KU			
5	8						Find Hidden Patterns	SNU			

Game Summary of Season 2
Day		Benefit Match			Main Match				Death Match	
#	Ep.	Game	Winner		Game	Winner			Game	Winner
1	1 – 3	Ace Selection	SNU	Kim Gyu-min	Formula Puzzle	SNU			Investigation Signal 2	KAIST
1	1 – 3	Ace Selection	SNU	Kim Gyu-min	Formula Puzzle	YONSEI			Investigation Signal 2	KAIST
1	1 – 3	Ace Selection	SNU	Kim Gyu-min	Formula Puzzle	POSTECH			Investigation Signal 2	MIT
1	1 – 3	Ace Selection	SNU	Kim Gyu-min	Formula Puzzle	OXFORD			Rock Paper Scissors Chess	KAIST
1	1 – 3	Ace Selection	SNU	Kim Gyu-min	Formula Puzzle	KU	KAIST	MIT	Rock Paper Scissors Chess	KAIST
2	4 – 5	Pyramid Game	KAIST		Blank CSAT	KAIST			Calculation Omok	POSTECH
2	4 – 5	Pyramid Game	KAIST		Blank CSAT	SNU			Calculation Omok	POSTECH
2	4 – 5	Pyramid Game	KAIST		Blank CSAT	YONSEI			Calculation Omok	POSTECH
2	4 – 5	Pyramid Game	KAIST		Blank CSAT	OXFORD			Calculation Omok	POSTECH
3	5 – 7	Blind Sudoku	KAIST	Hwang Gi-hyeon	Exit Strategy 2	KAIST	YONSEI		Rainbow Sequence	SNU
4	8				Decryption	SNU		KAIST		
5	8				Triple Maze	SNU				
5	8				Breaking the formula	SNU				

Game Summary of Season 3
Day		Ace Selection			Benefit Match			Main Match			Death Match		Repechange	
#	Ep.	Game	Ace(s)		Game	Winner		Game	Winner		Game	Winner	Game	Winner
1	1–2	Parallel Formula	KAIST	Jeon Ji-min	Minority Decision	SKKU	Kang Ji-hoo	Mining and Investment	SNU MED		Double-sided Bingo	KAIST		
1	1–2	Parallel Formula	KAIST	Jeon Ji-min	Minority Decision	SKKU	Kang Ji-hoo	Mining and Investment	YONSEI		Double-sided Bingo	KAIST		
1	1–2	Parallel Formula	SKKU	Kang Ji-hoo	Minority Decision	SKKU	Kang Ji-hoo	Mining and Investment	SNU STEM		Double-sided Bingo	KAIST		
1	1–2	Parallel Formula	SKKU	Kang Ji-hoo	Minority Decision	SKKU	Kang Ji-hoo	Mining and Investment	SKKU		Double-sided Bingo	KAIST		
2	2–4	Between Numbers	YONSEI	Choi A-in	3 Part	SNU STEM	Song Myung-soo	Exit Strategy 3	SNU STEM	KAIST	Mystery Poker	SKKU		
2	2–4	Between Numbers	SNU STEM	Song Myung-soo	3 Part	SNU STEM	Song Myung-soo	Exit Strategy 3	SNU STEM	KAIST	Mystery Poker	SNU MED		
3	4–5							Signal Investigation 3	SKKU	SNU MED	Lucky 21	SNU STEM	Relay Match	KAIST
4	6							The Average Dillema	KAIST		Block Omok	SNU MED		
4	6							The Average Dillema	SKKU		Block Omok	SNU MED		
5	7							Private Club	SNU MED		Clairvoyance Poker	SKKU		
6	8							Rainbow Chess	SNU MED					
6	8							Formula Death Note	SKKU					
6	8							Maze Craft	SNU MED					

=== Elimination Chart ===
Key
	Team that faced Death Match but survived
	Team that faced Death Match and eliminated
	Team that was eliminated in Death Match but revived in Redemption Round
	Team that won the round
	Team that lost the round
†	The team advanced to the Ace Match but lost.
‡	Team that won the Ace/Benefit Match and received benefits for the main match

Elimination Chart of Season 1
University	Day							Rank
University	1	2	3	4	5			Rank
SNU	IN ‡	IN	IN ‡	DM ‡	win	loss	win	Winner
KU	IN	IN	DM	IN †	loss	win	loss	2nd place
HARVARD	—N/a	IN ‡	IN	ELIM †				3rd place
YONSEI	IN †	DM †	ELIM †					4th place
KAIST	DM	ELIM						5th place
POSTECH	ELIM							6th place

Elimination Chart of Season 2
University	Day						Rank
University	1	2	3	4	5		Rank
SNU	IN ‡	IN	DM	IN ‡	win	win	Winner
KAIST	DM	IN ‡	IN ‡	IN	loss	loss	2nd place
YONSEI	IN	IN	IN	ELIM			3rd place
POSTECH	IN	DM	ELIM				4th place
OXFORD	IN	ELIM					5th place
MIT	ELIM						6th place
KU	ELIM						7th place

Elimination Chart of Season 3
University	Day								Rank
University	1	2	3	4	5	6			Rank
SNU MED	IN	DM	IN	DM	IN	win	loss	win	Winner
SKKU	IN ‡	DM	IN	IN	DM	loss	win	loss	2nd place
KAIST	DM †	IN	RV	IN	ELIM				3rd place
SNU STEM	IN	IN ‡	DM	ELIM					4th place
YONSEI	IN	ELIM †							5th place
POSTECH	ELIM								6th place

== Brain Games ==
Brain Games of Season 1

=== Ace Selection ===
==== Day 1: Electronic Brain ====
Instruction
1. All participants solve problems presented at each school's base and enter their answers.
2. The one participant from each school who answers the correct answer first and emerges from the main hall is selected as the ace.
3. Electronic Brain is a mental arithmetic competition in which players add 10 three-digit numbers presented on the screen and enter the value as the correct answer.
4. Participants in the base are prohibited from any conversation related to calculations.
5. The game ends when all participants enter the correct answer.
Progress Result

Question	428 + 591 + 972 + 879 + 919 + 174 + 342 + 567 + 603 + 298 =
Answer	5773

Rank	University	Contestant	Rank	University	Contestant
1	SNU	Jung Hyun-bin	11	SNU	Kyung Do-hyun
2	POSTECH	Shim Min-sub	12	POSTECH	Lee Hyun-soo
3	KU	Chae Seung-min	13	KU	Lee Dong-kyu
4	YONSEI	Park Na-yoon	14	SNU	Park Hyun-min
5	POSTECH	Moon So-yul	15	KAIST	Yang Joon-hyuk
6	KAIST	Heo Sung-bum	16	YONSEI	Son Ju-hyung
7	SNU	Song Hyun-seok	17	KAIST	So Hyun-ji
8	POSTECH	Shin Jae-yoon	18	KU	Kim Jung-min
9	YONSEI	Cho Hyun-jun	19	KU	Lee Ji-soo
10	KAIST	Choi Seo-yeon	20	YONSEI	Kim Ki-hong

==== Day 2: Perfect Number ====
Instruction
1. 'Perfect Number' is a game where you have to find the right number in each blank space so that all seven sentences presented on the screen are true.
2. The game ends when all participants answer correctly.
Progress Result

Question	There is/are ( ) number(s) 1 in this problem. There is/are ( ) number(s) 2 in this problem. There is/are ( ) number(s) 3 in this problem. There is/are ( ) number(s) 4 in this problem. There is/are ( ) number(s) 5 in this problem. There is/are ( ) number(s) 6 in this problem. There is/are ( ) number(s) 7 in this problem.
Answer	4 - 3 - 2 - 2 - 1 - 1 - 1
Explanation	Add 1 to 5, 6, and 7, where it is difficult to get more than 2. Therefore, 1 becomes 4, 4 becomes 2, 3 becomes 2, and 2 becomes 3.

Rank	University	Contestant	Rank	University	Contestant
1	YONSEI	Kim Ki-hong	11	SNU	Jung Hyun-bin
2	KAIST	So Hyun-ji	12	HARVARD	Ray
3	KAIST	Heo Sung-bum	13	KAIST	Yang Joon-hyuk
4	YONSEI	Son Ju-hyung	14	KU	Chae Seung-min
5	KU	Lee Dong-kyu	15	KU	Kim Jung-min
6	SNU	Song Hyun-seok	16	YONSEI	Park Na-yoon
7	YONSEI	Cho Hyun-jun	17	HARVARD	David
8	KU	Lee Ji-soo	18	SNU	Park Hyun-min
9	SNU	Kyung Do-hyun	19	KAIST	Choi Seo-yeon
10	HARVARD	Janice	20	HARVARD	Sky

==== Day 3: Birth Date ====
Instruction
1. 'Date of Birth' is a contest in which players memorize the birth dates of 10 people presented on the screen for 2 minutes and then guess the date of birth of each person.
2. Teams that do not select an Ace within the 5-minute time limit will be excluded from being selected as an opponent for the Ace Match.
Progress Result

Question
Albert Einstein	1879.03.14	Yi Sun-sin	1545.4.28
Yu Gwan-sun	1902.12.16	Marie Curie	1867.11.07
Yi Sang	1910.09.23	Jeong Yak-yong	1762.08.05
Thomas Edison	1847.02.11	Albert Schweitzer	1875.01.14
Sejong the Great	1397.05.15	Leonardo da Vinci	1452.04.15

Participant Ranking
Rank	University	Participant	Rank	University	Participant
1	YONSEI	Kim Ki-hong	9	KU	Kim Jung-min
2	SNU	Jung Hyun-bin	10	SNU	Song Hyun-seok
3	HARVARD	Ray	11	SNU	Park Hyun-min
4	KU	Lee Ji-soo	12	KU	Chae Seung-min
5	YONSEI	Cho Hyun-jun	13	YONSEI	Park Na-yoon
6	HARVARD	Sky	Unranked	KU	Lee Dong-kyu
7	SNU	Kyung Do-hyun	Unranked	HARVARD	David
8	YONSEI	Son Ju-hyung	Unranked	HARVARD	Janice

==== Day 4: Trail of Dice ====
Instruction
1. Trail of dice is a competition to guess the sum of the marks on the floor where the dice move.
2. In this selection competition, all participants who answer correctly can enter the main hall.
Progress Result

Question
Dice				Dice movement path		
	5				②	③
4	1	3				
	2					
	6		→	1	①	④
Question: There is a die whose faces add up to 7. When recording the side of the dice that touches the floor, ①+②+③+④=? Answer: 6 + 2 + 5 + 6 = 19

Participant Ranking
Rank	University	Participant	Rank	University	Participant
1	SNU	Kyung Do-hyun	7	SNU	Song Hyun-seok
2	SNU	Jung Hyun-bin	8	HARVARD	Ray
3	SNU	Park Hyun-min	9	HARVARD	David
4	KU	Kim Jung-min	10	KU	Lee Dong-kyu
5	KU	Chae Seung-min	11	HARVARD	Sky
6	HARVARD	Janice	12	KU	Lee Ji-soo

=== Ace Match ===
==== Day 1: Prime Number Check ====
Instruction
1. This is a game in which the participant who finds the most prime numbers on a game board filled with 25 number cubes wins.
2. The game lasts a total of 3 rounds, and the number section changes for each round.
3. Participants take turns finding prime numbers for 30 seconds each. If you find the prime number and answer correctly during your turn, you will receive 1 point and will be given one more opportunity to answer during the time limit.
4. If you answer incorrectly or fail to answer correctly during your turn, no points will be deducted and the opportunity will immediately pass to the other participant.
5. The undisclosed question mark cube in the middle represents a hidden prime number, and if you guess the hidden prime number correctly, you get 3 points.
6. The participant who gets 6 points first wins the round, and the participant who wins a total of 2 rounds first wins the ace match.
7. The Ace Match is conducted 1:1 with the first place participant in the Ace Selection Tournament nominating one of the Ace participants.
8. In the first round, the first place winner can decide, and in subsequent rounds, the side that lost in the previous round can choose.
9. The team that wins the ace match will receive benefits in the next game.
Progress Result

Jung Hyun-bin of Seoul National University, who came in first place in the selection competition, can chose his ace match opponent and selected Park Na-yoon of Yonsei University as his ace match.

- Round 1 : Jung Hyun-bin, who took first place in the Ace selection competition, chose to strike first.

Number Interval	500 – 570				
Primary Number	9				
Number Cube	523	543	527	563	533
Number Cube	549	517	509	553	519
Number Cube	513	531	?	503	559
Number Cube	537	501	541	529	557
Number Cube	547	539	507	567	511

Turn	Jung Hyun-bin (1st turn)	Park Na-yoon
1	523 / Correct; 509 / Correct; 503 / Correct; 541 / Correct; 547 / Correct; Hidden 521 / Correct	
Result	8 points (Won)	0 point (Lost)

- Round 2 : Park Na-yoon, who lost in the first round, chose to attack first.

Number Interval	1100 – 1180				
Primary Number	9				
Number Cube	1109	1149	1127	1141	1107
Number Cube	1157	1117	1161	1121	1171
Number Cube	1131	1101	?	1151	1113
Number Cube	1139	1153	1137	1119	1103
Number Cube	1123	1147	1169	1159	1129

Turn	Jung Hyun-bin	Park Na-yoon (1st turn)
1	1109 / Correct; 1107 / Wrong	1141 / Wrong
2	1117 / Correct; 1171 / Correct; 1101 / Wrong	1103 / Correct; Timeout exceeded
3	1121 / Wrong	1159 / Wrong
4	Timeout exceeded	1137 / Wrong
5	1153 / Correct; 1129 / Correct; 1169 / Wrong	1123 / Correct; 1147 / Wrong
6	Hidden 1163 / Correct	1151 / Correct; Timeout exceeded
Result	8 points (Won)	3 point (Lost)

- Result : Jung Hyun-bin won 2:0, and the main match benefit was provided to the Seoul National University team.

==== Day 2: Balance Game ====
Instruction
1. 'Balance game' is a game in which you win by comparing numbers and guessing the opponent's number combination first.
2. Two participants create and present different combinations of alphabet numbers A, B, C, and D that add up to 20.
3. However, numbers cannot use decimal points or fractions and must be single digits.
4. Within two minutes of starting the game, participants can compare their own alphabet and their opponent's alphabet using one of two methods.
5. First, point out one of your own alphabets and one of your partner's alphabets and compare them.
6. Second, compare the sum of the two own alphabets with the sum of the two other alphabets.
7. The two participants take turns checking each other, and the time limit is 2 minutes.
8. If you answer correctly after a challenge, you immediately win, but if you answer incorrectly, the opportunity passes to your opponent.
9. The team that wins the game is provided with favorable benefits for the next main match.
10. The first place participant in the Ace Selection Competition nominates one of the other Ace candidates and the match is held 1:1. The first and second players are chosen by the first-place participant in the Ace Selection Tournament.
Progress Result

Kim Ki-hong, who came in first, chose Janice as his ace match opponent. Meanwhile, participants watching during the game were able to check the card number of the participant nominated by the team.

Turn	Kim Ki-hong				Janice			
Card	A	B	C	D	A	B	C	D
Number	3	7	6	4	4	8	6	2
Round 1	B < B				B > C			
Round 2	D < C				D = A			
Round 3	A+B = A+C				3	7	6	4
Result	Defeat				Win			

==== Day 3: Blind Omok ====
Instruction
1. Blind Omok is an omok contest in which two participants rely on memory without looking at the omok board.
2. Participants take turns pointing out coordinates one by one within the two-minute time limit. At this time, the status of the engraving board is not disclosed to the participants.
3. You cannot start in a place where a stone has already been placed or in the 3-3 position, and you can only restart once.
4. In the first round, the winner of the ace selection will be selected, and in rounds 2 and 3, the participant who lost in the previous round will be the first player.
5. A total of 3 rounds will be played, and the participant who wins 2 rounds first will win the Ace Match.
Progress Result

Yonsei University's Kim Ki-hong, who ranked first in the selection competition, chose Jung Hyun-bin of Seoul National University as his opponent. In the Seoul National University team, Kyung Do-hyun took the lead in preparing the strategy and taught us how to utilize the 3-3 golden number. In the Yonsei University team, Cho Hyun-jun led the strategy preparation and taught aggressive management that took advantage of going first.

Round 1 : Kim Ki-hong chose to strike first.

Omok Board
	6	7	8	9	10	11	12
F					∘		
G	∘	•	∘	∘	•		
H		∘	∘	•	•	•	•
I			∘	∘	•	∘	
J		•	•	∘	•		
K					∘	•	

Player Round
Round	Kim Ki-hong (white)	Jung Hyun-bin (black)
1	H11	I11
2	J10	I9
3	I10	K10
4	H9	G8
5	H11	H8
6	G7	I8
7	G10	F10
8	J8	G9
9	J7	J9
10	K11	~~I9~~ H7
11	H12	G6
Result	Lose (0)	Win (1)

Round 2 : Loser of the previous round, Kim Ki-hong, strike first.

Omok Board
	9	10	11	12	13	14	15	16
G					∘			
H	∘	•	∘	∘	•	∘		
I		∘	•	•	•	∘		
J		•		∘	•	∘		
K						•		
L							•	
M								•

Player Round
Round	Kim Ki-hong (black)	Jung Hyun-bin (white)
1	I11	J12
2	I13	H12
3	I12	I10
4	H13	I14
5	J13	G13
6	J10	H14
7	K14	~~H12~~ H14
8	L15	H11
9	H10	H9
10	M16	—
Result	Win (1)	Lose (1)

Round 3 : Loser of the previous round, Jung Hyun-bin, strike first.

Omok Board
	7	8	9	10	11	12	13
G					∘		
H				∘			
I			∘	•	•		•
J		∘		∘		•	
K	∘				•		

Player Round
Round	Jung Hyun-bin (white)	Kim Ki-hong (black)
1	H10	I11
2	J10	I10
3	I9	K11
4	G11	J12
5	J8	I13
6	K7	—
Result	Win (2)	Lose (1)

==== Day 4: Relay Match ====
Instruction
1. The fourth round ace match will be held as a relay match in which all members of the three teams participate.
2. The relay match lasts a total of 3 rounds, with 4 questions asked in rounds 1 and 2, and 3 questions asked in round 3. The problem type changes every round.
3. The Ace Selection Tournament is conducted in a winning streak system where the first person with the correct answer nominates an opponent, and the winning participant nominates the next opponent to continue the game.
4. At the end of the relay match, the main match benefit will be provided to the university team with the highest total points among participants.
5. Round 1: Modified multiplication tables
  The modified multiplication table is a competition to calculate the value of adding 'the multiplication of two numbers' (A×B) and 'the sum of two numbers' (A+B). Problems are provided in A◈B format.
6. Round 2: Counting blocks
  Counting blocks is a competition to guess the total number of blocks stacked in a presented picture.
7. Round 3: Numbers that bite each other
  It is a battle in which you win by finding all the numbers that fit in three blank spaces among the number boxes arranged regularly.
Progress Result

List of problems
Round		Question	Explanation	Answer
1R	1	21◈17	(21×17) + (21+17)	395
1R	2	12◈23	(12×23) + (12+23)	311
1R	3	(4◈12)◈9	(((4×12)+(4+12))×9) + (((4×12)+(4+12))+9)	649
1R	4	(6◈2)◈27	(((6×2)+(6+2))×27) + (((6×2)+(6+2))+27)	587
2R	1	—N/a	—N/a	65
2R	2	—N/a	—N/a	62
2R	3	—N/a	—N/a	100
2R	4	—N/a	—N/a	58
3R	1	1 , 3 , 6 , 8 , 16 , ? ,	Repeat +2 and ×2	18
3R	1	65 , 61 , 37 , 58 , ? ,	Square of first digit + square of second digit	89
3R	1	90 , 92 , 96 , 104 , 120 , ?	Geometric sequence in which the sequential difference increases by a factor of 2	152
3R	2	4 , 3 , 4 , 9 , 22 , ? ,	A geometric sequence in which the difference between series (the second order) increases by a factor of 2.	51
3R	2	17 , 21 , 7 , 11 , ? ,	Repeat of ÷3 and +4	11/3
3R	2	3 , 13/5 , 7/3 , 15/7 , 2 , ?	A sequence in which the numerator and denominator of the previous term are each added +1	17/9
3R	3	0 , 1 , 5 , 15 , 34 , 65 , ? ,	An arithmetic sequence in which the difference between series (second order difference) increases by 3.	111
3R	3	100 , 122 , 89 , 133 , 78 , ? ,	Minus/Plus intersect and increases or decreases in multiples of 11 (-11, +22, -33...)	144
3R	3	36 , 18 , 13.5 , 13.5 , ?	×n/4, n increases from 1 to 1.	135/8

Game Progress
Round	Defender			Attacker		
1R	SNU	Kyung Do-hyun	win	KU	Lee Ji-soo	loss
1R	SNU	Kyung Do-hyun	win	HARVARD	Sky	loss
1R	SNU	Kyung Do-hyun	win	HARVARD	David	loss
1R	SNU	Kyung Do-hyun	loss	KU	Kim Jung-min	win
2R	KU	Kim Jung-min	win	HARVARD	Ray	loss
2R	KU	Kim Jung-min	win	SNU	Park Hyun-min	loss
2R	KU	Kim Jung-min	win	HARVARD	Janice	loss
2R	KU	Kim Jung-min	loss	SNU	Jung Hyun-bin	win
3R	SNU	Jung Hyun-bin	loss	KU	Lee Dong-kyu	win
3R	KU	Lee Dong-kyu	loss	SNU	Song Hyun-seok	win
3R	SNU	Song Hyun-seok	win	KU	Chae Seung-min	loss

Game Result
Team	Participant				Total Points
SNU	Kyung Do-hyun; 3 Points	Park Hyun-min; 0 Point	Jung Hyun-bin; 1 Point	Song Hyun-seok; 2 Points	6 Points
KU	Lee Ji-soo; 0 Point	Kim Jung-min; 4 Points	Lee Dong-kyu; 1 Point	Chae Seung-min; 0 Point	5 Points
HARVARD	Sky; 0 Point	David; 0 Point	Ray; 0 Point	Janice; 0 Point	0 Point

=== Main Matches ===
==== Day 1: 300 ====
Instruction
1. This is a game where you win by answering the 300 calculation problems presented first.
2. Correct answers are entered using a tablet in the center of the stage, and 30 answers can be entered per page, consisting of ten pages in total.
3. If you enter all 300 correct answers, you can check the number of incorrect answers. However, if you do not fill out even one of the 300 answers, you cannot check the number of incorrect answers.
4. There is no limit to the solution time or number of correct answers, and the top three university teams that first achieve 0 incorrect answers survive and advance to the next round, while the bottom two teams become candidates for elimination and play a death match.
5. After submission, the number of incorrect answers is revealed and the waiting time for re-entry takes 10 seconds.
6. Benefit: Priority access to 5 questions - 5 questions will be released in advance for 2 minutes.
Progress Result

Question

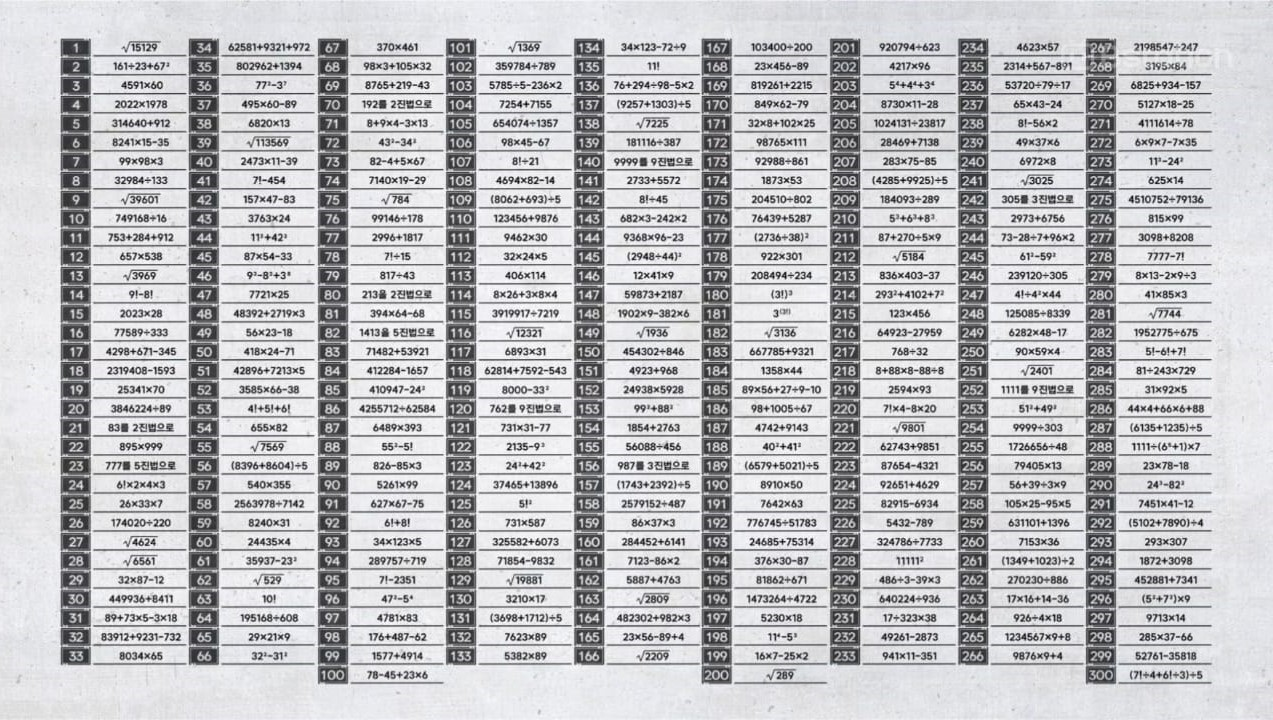
300 mathematic questions for Round 1 Main Match

Result

1st Place	YONSEI	
2nd Place	KU	
3rd Place	SNU	
4th Place	KAIST	POSTECH

==== Day 2: Investigation Signal ====
Instruction
1. In 'Signal Investigation', before the game starts, three investigators are appointed to observe the criminal and one arresting officer is appointed to find the criminal.
2. Each team is provided with 15 signal cards, and before the battle begins, four officer gather at each team's base camp and write down their own information on the 15 cards for 30 minutes to be used to apprehend the criminal.
3. Any content can be written on the signal card, but the number of characters is limited to 20 characters. Does not include spaces.
4. When the game starts, the three investigators and one arresting officer are separated.
5. The three investigators will observe the criminal for 20 minutes and create up to 10 evidence photos using the 15 signal cards previously created.
6. You can use one signal card per photo, but it is also possible to use it multiple times.
7. Seal the 10 evidence photos in an investigation envelope and deliver them to the arresting officer.
8. Once the information is delivered, the arresting officer submits a photo of the eight suspects presumed to be the culprit in an investigation envelope within 10 minutes based on the information received from the three investigators.
9. It will be held in a total of 3 rounds, and at the end of the round, 10 minutes of meeting time and the opportunity to modify 15 signal cards will be provided.
10. At the end of the signal investigation, the top three teams with the most hits on the criminal will survive, and the bottom two teams will advance to the death match.
11. However, if the number of correct culprits is the same as a result of the three rounds combined, the team that used fewer evidence photos survives.
12. Benefit: 1 additional signal card
Progress Result

Round 1

Picture explanation
Information	Picture 1	Picture 2	Picture 3	Picture 4	Picture 5	Picture 6	Picture 7	Picture 8
Gender	Female	Female	Male	Female	Female	Female	Male	Male
Hair	Light brown Short	Brown; Long	Black; Short	Brown; Long	Black; Short	Black; Long	Black; Short	Black; Short
Clothes								
Shoes	—	Grey	White	Black	—	—	White	Grey
Facial								
Stuff	X	X	X	X	Violin	Clarinet	X	X

	SNU	KAIST	YONSEI	KU	HARVARD
Arresting Officer	Jung Hyun-bin	So Hyun-ji	Cho Hyun-jun	Kim Jung-min	David
Investigators	Kyung Do-hyun; Park Hyun-min; Song Hyun-seok	Yang Joon-hyuk; Choi Seo-yeon; Heo Sung-bum	Kim Ki-hong; Park Na-yoon; Son Ju-hyung	Lee Dong-kyu; Lee Ji-soo; Chae Seung-min	Janice; Ray; Sky
Photo Evidence	1	1	2	1	2
Criminal Arrested	Success	Fail	Success	Success	Success

Round 2

Picture explanation
Information	Picture 1	Picture 2	Picture 3	Picture 4	Picture 5	Picture 6	Picture 7	Picture 8
Gender	Male	Male	Male	Male	Male	Male	Male	Male
Hair								
Clothes								
Shoes								
Facial								
Stuff								

	SNU	KAIST	YONSEI	KU	HARVARD
Arresting Officer	Jung Hyun-bin	So Hyun-ji	Cho Hyun-jun	Kim Jung-min	David
Investigators	Kyung Do-hyun; Park Hyun-min; Song Hyun-seok	Yang Joon-hyuk; Choi Seo-yeon; Heo Sung-bum	Kim Ki-hong; Park Na-yoon; Son Ju-hyung	Lee Dong-kyu; Lee Ji-soo; Chae Seung-min	Janice; Ray; Sky
Photo Evidence	1	2	2	1	2
Criminal Arrested	Success	Success	Success	Success	Success

Round 3

Picture explanation
Information	Picture 1	Picture 2	Picture 3	Picture 4	Picture 5	Picture 6	Picture 7	Picture 8
Gender	Female							
Hair	Black; Long	Brown; Short	Brown; Short	Black; Short	Black; Long	Brown; Long	Black; Medium	Brown; Long
Clothes	Yellow shirt Long black dress							
Shoes	Black; Heels	Black; Flats	Black; Wedges	Black; Flats	Black; Wedges	Black; Heels	Black; Heels	Black; Wedges
Facial								
Stuff	Red rose	White rose	Red rose	Red rose	Red rose	Red rose	White rose	White rose

	SNU	KAIST	YONSEI	KU	HARVARD
Arresting Officer	Jung Hyun-bin	So Hyun-ji	Son Ju-hyung	Kim Jung-min	David
Investigators	Kyung Do-hyun; Park Hyun-min; Song Hyun-seok	Yang Joon-hyuk; Choi Seo-yeon; Heo Sung-bum	Kim Ki-hong; Park Na-yoon; Cho Hyun-jun	Lee Dong-kyu; Lee Ji-soo; Chae Seung-min	Janice; Ray; Sky
Photo Evidence	1	1	1	1	1
Criminal Arrested	Success	Success	Fail	Success	Success

Game Result

	SNU	KU	HARVARD	KAIST	YONSEI
Photo Evidence	3	3	5	4	4
Criminal Arrested	3	3	3	2	2
Result	Pass			Death Match	

==== Day 3: Silent Human Chess ====
Instruction
1. Silent Human Chess is a joint competition between two university teams and is a chess match in which all participants play as pieces.
2. Conversation is prohibited on the chessboard, so players must use their own judgment.
3. Participants are divided into the roles of 2 rooks, 2 bishops, and 1 king. The rook can move one space up, down, left, and right, the bishop can move one space diagonally, and the king can move one space in any direction. Also, the king can skip a piece regardless of whether he is an enemy or an ally.
4. Both teams are assigned numbers 1 to 5, and can only move on their turn in the designated order.
5. The starting five players will be placed in their own camp first, and the remaining three players will be substituted.
6. Both teams must move their pieces in a pre-determined order with a one-minute time limit. Once set, the movement order cannot be changed.
7. If a piece is caught by the opposing team, a replacement member takes over the role of the captured piece. However, the insertion of a replacement member is only possible in the last row of the player's camp when the existing piece is captured and the turn comes back on the next turn.
8. Additionally, if all substitutes are taken and there are no more pieces in that turn, the opportunity to move passes to the opponent's next numbered piece.
9. The king of each team may request a strategy meeting during the game only once at any time.
10. You win if you capture the opposing team's king or if your king stays in the opponent's camp for two turns.
11. The two teams from the winning alliance advance to the fourth round, and the two teams from the losing alliance play a death match.
12. Coalitions are freely selected by participants.
13. If you speak during chess, warnings accumulate, and pieces that have been warned more than twice are automatically removed from the game board. (Note: This is a rule that was not explained on air and was revealed behind the scenes.)
14. Benefit: The right to decide who goes first and who goes next
Progress Result

Before the game starts : The Seoul National University team chose to attack first through Ace Match Benefit. The Harvard team chose to form an alliance with the Seoul National University team. (Hereinafter, the Seoul National University + Harvard team will be described as Team A, and the Yonsei University + Korea University team will be described as Team B.)

Turn Order and Role Assignment
Turn Team	1	2	3	4	5	Bench Member		
Team A	Rook	Bishop	King	Rook	Bishop	—		
Team A	Janice	David	Ray	Kyung Do-hyun	Jung Hyun-bin	Song Hyun-seok	Park Hyun-min	Sky
Team B	Bishop	Rook	Bishop	King	Rook	—		
Team B	Kim Jung-min	Kim Ki-hong	Lee Ji-soo	Cho Hyun-jun	Park Na-yoon	Lee Dong-kyu	Chae Seung-min	Son Ju-hyung

Starting game board

	1	2	3	4	5
A		Park Na-yoon ^{(Rook)}		Kyung Do-hyun ^{(Rook)}	
B		Lee Ji-soo^{(Bishop)}		Jung Hyun-bin^{(Bishop)}	
C		Kim Jung-min^{(Bishop)}		David^{(Bishop)}	Ray^{(King)}
D	Cho Hyun-jun^{(King)}			Janice^{(Rook)}	
E		Kim Ki-hong^{(Rook)}			

Turn		Team A (white)	Team B (black)
1	1	Janice E4	Kim Jung-min B1
1	2	David D5	Kim Ki-hong D2
1	3	Ray C4	Lee Ji-soo C1
1	4	Kyung Do-hyun E5	Cho Hyun-jun E1
1	5	Jung Hyun-bin C3	Park Na-yoon A1
2	6	Janice D4	Kim Jung-min A2
2	7	David E4	Kim Ki-hong E2
2	8	Ray D3	Lee Ji-soo D2
2	9	Kyung Do-hyun A4	Cho Hyun-jun C3; Caught Jung Hyun-bin
2	10	Jung Hyun-bin Pass	Park Na-yoon B1
3	11	Janice C4	Kim Jung-min B3
3	12	David D5	Kim Ki-hong E1
3	13	Ray C3; Caught Cho Hyun-jun	
Result		win	loss

Notes: Just before Cho Hyun-jun's move on turn 9, Team B used the operation time. This is because no matter where Cho Hyun-jun's options move, he is sure to lose.

Turn 9 : Cho Hyun-jun's options
	1	2	3	4	5
A	5th Park Na-yoon ^{(Rook)}	1st Kim Jung-min^{(Bishop)}		4th Kyung Do-hyun ^{(Rook)}	
B					
C			5th Jung Hyun-bin^{(Bishop)}		
D		3rd Lee Ji-soo^{(Bishop)}	3rd Ray^{(King)}	1st Janice^{(Rook)}	
E	4th Cho Hyun-jun^{(King)}	2nd Kim Ki-hong^{(Rook)}		2nd David^{(Bishop)}	

Cho Hyun-jun's possible move option and its effect:

- if he move to C3 (skip 3rd rook) (capture 5th bishop) → Will get caught by opponent's 3rd king in the next turn.
- if he move to D1 → Will get caught by opponent's 3rd king in the next turn.
- if he move to E3 (skip 2nd rook) → Will get caught by opponent's 3rd king in the next turn.

==== Day 4: Find Me ====
Instruction
1. Find Me is a competition to infer the MBTI of participants from other universities through information sharing.
2. Participants are randomly assigned to one of 16 MBTI types. The MBTI of all participants is different and is not disclosed to other teams.
3. When two participants who agree to share information place their MBTI cards on the table in front of the host, the number of matching alphabet letters among the unique MBTIs of the two participants is revealed on the screen.
4. It lasts 30 minutes, 10 minutes per round, and a total of 3 rounds. Within 3 rounds, each team writes and submits the MBTI of other team members deduced through information sharing.
5. You earn 1 point each time you guess the MBTI of another team member. The top university with the most points at the end of the match survives, and the other bottom two teams advance to a death match.
6. However, in case of a tie, the team that submitted the answer first survives.
7. Benefit: Designated confirmation ticket. You can point out a specific person, ask them about their MBTI, and get a yes/no answer.
Progress Result

MBTI Raffle
Team	SNU	KU	HARVARD	Not selected
Participants (MBTI)	Kyung Do-hyun; ENTJ	Kim Jung-min; INTP	David; INFJ	INTJ
Participants (MBTI)	Park Hyun-min; ISFP	Lee Dong-kyu; ISTP	Janice; ISFJ	ENTP
Participants (MBTI)	Song Hyun-seok; ESTJ	Lee Ji-soo; ESTP	Ray; ISTJ	ESFJ
Participants (MBTI)	Jung Hyun-bin; ENFJ	Chae Seung-min; ESFP	Sky; ENFP	INFP

Game Progress
Turn		Participant 1	Participant 2	Common Letter
Round 1	1	Jung Hyun-bin	Lee Ji-soo	1
Round 1	2	Song Hyun-seok	Kim Jung-min	1
Round 1	3	Jung Hyun-bin	Sky	3
Round 1	4	Lee Ji-soo	Ray	2
Round 1	5	Park Hyun-min	Lee Ji-soo	2
Round 1	6	Kim Jung-min	David	2
Round 2	1	Lee Ji-soo	Janice	1
Round 2	2	Jung Hyun-bin	Lee Dong-kyu	0
Round 2	3	Chae Seung-min	Sky	3
Round 2	4	Chae Seung-min	Ray	1
Round 2	5	Song Hyun-seok	David	1
Round 2	6	Jung Hyun-bin	Ray	1
Round 3	1	Jung Hyun-bin	David	3
Round 3	2	Lee Dong-kyu	Ray	3
Round 3	3	David	Lee Ji-soo	0
Round 3	SNU Benefit : Lee Ji-soo ESTP ( ✓)			
Round 3	4	Chae Seung-min	Janice	2
Round 3	Korea University Submitted the Answer			
Round 3	Harvard University Submitted the Answer			
Round 3	Seoul National University Submitted the Answer			

Game Result
Right answer ; Wrong answer
Answer Sheet	KU	HARVARD	SNU
Kyung Do-hyun	ISFJ	INTJ	
Park Hyun-min	ENFP	ESFJ	
Song Hyun-seok	ESTJ	ESTJ	
Jung Hyun-bin	ENFJ	ENFJ	
Kim Jung-min		INTP	INFJ
Lee Dong-kyu		ISTP	ISTP
Lee Ji-soo		ESTP	ESTP
Chae Seungmin		INFP	ENTJ
David	INFJ		ENFP
Janice	INFP		ESFP
Ray	ISTJ		ISTJ
Sky	ENFP		ESFJ
Points	5 points	5 points	3 points
Result	Win	Death Match	

==== Day 5: Final ====
===== Round 1: Formula Safe =====
Instruction
1. The formula safe is a competition to create a target number by unlocking 28 safes composed of 4-digit passwords.
2. Before the match begins, two people from each team are assigned the roles of one in charge of memorization and one in charge of arrange math formula.
3. When the competition begins, the memorizer participant has 5 minutes to memorize the 28 safe passwords and then has 10 minutes to open the safe lock. (The safe password is 4 digits each.)
4. The person in charge of memorization obtains the number cards and operation symbol cards from the safe and delivers them to the person in charge of math.
5. Inside the 28 safes, there are 2 sets of 10 number cards from 1 to 10, and the bonus operation symbols power ⌃, root √, parentheses (), and factorial ! There are 2 sets of 4 types of symbol cards, 1 each.
6. The person in charge of math must complete the target number within the 5-minute time limit using the basic operation card and the card received from the person in charge of memorization. The number cards obtained at this time cannot be pasted and used as 2-3 digit numbers, and the used number cards can be reused.
7. The target number is revealed three times per round, and the team that completes the target number first earns one point. After a total of 3 rounds, the team that scores 5 points first wins.
8. The safe is made of transparent material, so you can visually check which card is in which safe. The passwords and card placement for both teams are the same.
Progress Result

Role Selection
1	2	3	VS	1	2	3
Korea University			VS	Seoul National University		
Chae Seung-min	Lee Ji-soo	Lee Ji-soo	Memorization role	Jung Hyun-bin	Park Hyun-min	—N/a
Kim Jung-min	Lee Dong-kyu	Lee Dong-kyu	Math Formula role	Kyung Do-hyun	Song Hyun-seok	Jung Hyun-bin

Round 1

Memorization
⌃ 6034	1; 2184	2; 8243	3; 9259	4; 1752	5; 0351	^ 5963
(); 4652	6; 0214	7; 2583	8; 7415	9; 3961	10; 6025	(); 1007
! 8624	1; 1463	2; 9431	3; 5374	4; 6430	5; 7155	! 2809
√ 5012	6; 3875	7; 7206	8; 2918	9; 1209	10; 3744	√ 8507

Formula acquired by each team
Team/Participant	Chae Seung-min	Jung Hyun-bin
Formula	1, 3, 6, 7, 8, 9, ^, ()^	1, 2, 3, 4, 5, 6, 7, 8, 9, 10, ^, (), ! 5, 8, 9, 10, ^, ()
Total	9	19

Turn	Target Number	Participant	Formula Submission	Result	Score
1	133	Kyung Do-hyun	$2^{7+5}$	Correct	0:1
2	0.9375	Kyung Do-hyun	$(10+5)\div(4^{2})$	Correct	0:2
3	1234	Kyung Do-hyun	$6^{4}-2\times3\times10-7+5$	Correct	0:3

Round 2

Memorization
⌃ 6034	1; 2184	2; 8243	3; 9259	4; 1752	5; 0351	^ 5963
(); 4652	6; 0124	7; 2583	8; 7415	9; 3961	10; 6025	(); 1007
! 8624	1; 1463	2; 9431	3; 5374	4; 6130	5; 7155	! 2809
√ 5012	6; 3875	7; 7206	8; 2918	9; 1209	10; 3744	√ 8507

Formula acquired by each team
Team/Participant	Lee Ji-soo	Park Hyun-min
Formula	1, 2, 3, 4, 5, 6, 7, 8, 9, 10, ^, (), !, √ 5, 6, ^, (), !	1, 2, 3, 4, 5, 6, 7, 8, 9, 10, ^, (), !, √ 1, 2, 3, 4, 5, 6, 7, 8, 9, 10, ^, (), !, √
Total	19 (10 new)	28 (9 new)

Turn	Target Number	Participant	Formula Submission	Result	Score
4	3135	Lee Dong-kyu	$5^{5+10}$	Correct	1:3
5	1987	Lee Dong-kyu	$2\times10^{3}-6\times4+1$	False	1:3
5	1987	Song Hyun-seok	$6^{4}-2\times3\times10-7+5$	Correct	1:4
6	78125	Lee Dong-kyu	$5^{7}$	Correct	2:4

Round 3

Notes: The memorization passcode table did not got any close-up during the broadcast

Formula acquired by each team
Team/Participant	Lee Ji-soo	SNU
Formula	1, 2, 3, 4, 5, 6, 7, 8, 9, 10, +, −, ÷, ×, (), ^ 1, 2, 3, 4, 5, 6, 7, 8, 9, 10, +, −, ÷, ×, (), ^	1, 2, 3, 4, 5, 6, 7, 8, 9, 10, +, −, ÷, ×, (), ^ 1, 2, 3, 4, 5, 6, 7, 8, 9, 10, +, −, ÷, ×, (), ^
Total	28 (9 new)	28

Turn	Target Number	Participant	Formula Submission	Result	Score
7	4805	Jung Hyun-bin	$10^{2}\times3\times4^2+5$	Correct	2:5

===== Round 2: Exit Strategy =====
Instruction
1. There are four entrances and one exit on the game board, and all participants move as horses.
2. Each team enters the game board with two participants as starters, and at this time, the four starters select different entrances.
3. Latecomers can freely choose any entrance.
4. Once entered, participants must reach the exit before escaping, and participants can only move in a straight line once per turn. Stop if there are obstacles or other participants in your path.
5. Only a maximum of two participants per team can enter the game board, and the participant who was waiting after the team member escapes enters.
6. In this way, the pieces take turns moving, and the team wins when all four members escape.
7. The game board is 11×11 in size, and the locations of entrances/obstacles/exits are not revealed in advance.
8. The first and second ball are decided by throwing dice. 10 minutes of preparation time is provided before the game starts. An additional 3 minutes of meeting time will be provided immediately after the game starts.
9. Participants can talk freely regardless of the game board.
Progress Result

Game Board
				Finish			
		•					
•						•	
	•						•
				•			
•							
			•				•
					•		
↑		↑				↑	↑

===== Round 3: Find Hidden Patterns =====
Instruction
1. Finding Hidden Patterns is a competition in which players must find more target patterns on a game board made up of arrows pointing north, south, east, and west.
2. When a target pattern of 2 squares horizontally and 2 squares vertically is presented, you must find the area with the presented target pattern on the game board, which is made up of 10 squares horizontally and 8 squares vertically.
3. However, the presented target pattern can be entered in the forward direction or rotated 90/180/270 degrees. However, cases where the image is reversed left/right/up/down are not accepted.
4. Starting with the first participant, they must take turns shouting 'correct answer' within the 10-second time limit and saying the coordinates corresponding to the upper left corner of the area that matches the target pattern.
5. If the answer is correct, 1 point is awarded, and if the answer is incorrect, 1 point is deducted. One point will also be deducted if an answer that has already been confirmed is repeated. If the name is not called, the turn passes to the opponent without change in score.
6. If you can no longer shout out the correct answer on the game board, shout 'end'. If there are no more areas that match the target pattern, 3 points are scored and the round ends. If not, 2 points are deducted and the turn is passed to the opponent.
7. During your turn, you can shout out the correct answer and then shout the end within 5 seconds.
8. It lasts for a total of 6 rounds, and the target pattern is changed each round, and the game board is changed before the start of the 4th round. All participants must participate once until the 4th round, after which they can participate freely.
9. The winner of the first round is decided by rolling the dice.
10. The team with more points at the end of round 6 wins.
Strategy
- Determine the number of patterns remaining

It is important to shout out the end and get 3 points, so make sure that the number of correct answers remaining on your turn is an odd number, assuming you have accurately figured out the number of correct answers remaining. This is the strategy mentioned by Kyung Do-hyun on the broadcast.

- Find with space in the middle

Find the pattern by looking at the white space in the middle, divided by the arrow part of the target pattern, as a single shape. The strategy mentioned by Chae Seung-min on the broadcast.

Progress Result

Turn	Korea University	Points		Seoul National University
1R	Kim Jung-min	2	4	Kyung Do-hyun
2R	Lee Dong-kyu	6	7	Park Hyun-min
3R	Lee Ji-soo	6	8	Jung Hyun-bin
4R	Chae Seung-min	7	12	Song Hyun-seok
5R	Kim Jung-min	7	15	Song Hyun-seok
6R	Kim Jung-min	11	22	Jung Hyun-bin
Final	Loss	11	22	Win

Rounds 1–3

Game Board
	1	2	3	4	5	6	7	8	9	10
A	→	↑	←	↑	↓	↓	←	→	↑	←
B	↓	→	←	↓	←	←	↑	↑	←	↓
C	↓	→	←	↑	→	↓	←	↓	→	←
D	←	↓	↓	↑	↓	↑	←	↓	↑	→
E	→	←	←	←	↑	↓	→	↑	←	↑
F	↑	↓	←	↓	→	↑	→	←	↓	→
G	←	↑	→	←	↓	←	↑	→	↓	↑
H	↓	→	↑	←	↑	↓	→	↓	↑	←

Rounds 4–6

Game Board
	1	2	3	4	5	6	7	8	9	10
A	↓	↑	←	→	↑	↓	→	↑	↓	→
B	→	↑	→	↓	←	←	→	↓	←	←
C	↑	←	↑	↓	↑	↓	←	→	→	↑
D	←	→	↓	←	↑	←	←	↑	↑	↓
E	↓	↑	↓	←	↓	→	↑	→	↓	←
F	→	↑	→	→	←	↓	↓	↑	→	→
G	↑	←	←	↓	←	→	↓	←	←	←
H	→	→	→	↑	↓	↑	↓	↑	→	↓

=== Death Match ===
==== Day 1: Formula Archery ====
Instruction
1. This is a game where you use four numbers and operation symbols to create the target number presented on the archery board.
2. Each team is given two sets of numbered cards from 1 to 6. Afterwards, two cards selected from among the number cards are revealed to the opposing team.
3. A total of four numbers submitted by both teams and the presented operation symbols must be used to create the target number displayed on the archery board.
4. The operation symbols provided are plus+, subtraction-, multiplication×, division÷, square⌃, root√, parentheses(), and factorial!.
5. Number cards can only be used as single-digit numbers, and used number cards and operation symbols can be reused.
6. The team that completed the formula rings the bell, says the target number completed within 3 seconds, and raises the blackboard to reveal the completed formula.
7. On the archery board, a white circle scores 1 point, a black circle scores 2 points, a blue circle scores 3 points, a red circle scores 4 points, and a yellow circle scores 5 points.
8. Additionally, if you match three adjacent target numbers within the same color circle, you will receive 2 additional points.
9. The team that scores 25 points first wins and advances to the next round, while the losing team is eliminated in the first round.
10. It can be written in the form of a fraction in a formula, and there is no limit to the number of operation symbols used.
Progress Result

Picture explanation
1 point	1.25		-2	1	37	19
1 point	45		-7	108	216	15
1 point	66		31	90	-0.5	54
2 points	15625		52	78	1.2	701
2 points	7777		-1.5	47	2.25	732
3 points	716	244	601	5184	4090	-351
4 points	173		373		777	
5 points	8388610					

Game Progress
Round	Number Cards		Team	Formula	Target Number	Result	Score	
Round	POSTECH	KAIST	Team	Formula	Target Number	Result	POSTECH	KAIST
1R	1, 4	1, 5		1^{1^{4^{5}}}	1	Correct	0	1
2R	2, 5	1, 3		1^{(2+5)}-3	−2	Correct	0	2
3R	4, 5	4, 5		(4÷5)×5-4	1.25	Correct	0	5
4R	2, 6	5, 6		6^{2}+6−5	37	Correct	1	5
5R	3, 6	1, 6		6×3+1^{6}	19	Correct	2	5
6R	3, 2	3, 5		Time Out				
6R	3, 2	3, 5		(3+3)^{(5-2)}	216	Correct	3	5
7R	3, 5	3, 5		Time Out				
7R	3, 5	3, 5		3^{(5-3)}×5	45	Correct	6	5
8R	6, 4	6, 1		6+4+6−1	15	Correct	7	5
9R	3, 6	1, 5		6^{5}+1^{3}	7777	Correct	7	7
10R	3, 5	5, 1		5^{3!}×1^{3}	15625	Correct	7	9
11R	6, 6	4, 1		6×(6+4+1)	66	Correct	10	9
12R	3, 4	1, 4		3/4×(4−1)	2.25	Correct	12	9
13R	Edited Out			3−1−4−5	−7	Correct	13	9
14R	2, 2	3, 4		(3!)!−4/2×2	716	Correct	13	12
15R	2, 2	2, 2		2/2÷2−2	−0.5	Correct	14	12
16R	2, 2	2, 2		(2+2/2)−2	−1.5	Correct	14	14
17R	5, 2	6, 2		5!×2+6−2	244	Correct	17	14
18R	5, 5	1, 5		5×5!1^{5}	601	Correct	17	17
19R	6, 4	2, 3		4^{6}−2×3	4090	Correct	20	17
20R	4, 6	2, 3		3^{6}+4!×2	777	Correct	20	21
21R	4. 6	3, 4		6!/4−(3+4)	173	Correct	20	25

==== Day 2: Pixel Number ====
Instruction
1. 'Pixel Number' is a game where the team that finds more pixel combinations that create numbers when looking at a picture wins.
2. As soon as the battle begins, 15 pixel cards and three target numbers are revealed.
3. The target number refers to the number that appears when pixel cards are overlapped, and there are two or more pixel cards to create a target number.
4. The participant who rings the bell first is given the opportunity, and must shout out the combination of pixel cards that will complete the target number within 10 seconds.
5. If the answer is correct, you get 1 point. If the answer is wrong or the time exceeds 10 seconds, the opportunity passes to the other person.
6. Proceed in the same way and the round ends when all given target numbers are completed.
7. It will be held in a total of 5 rounds, with rounds 1-4 having 3 target numbers, and round 5 having 2 target numbers and 1 private target number.
8. If you guess the secret target number, you get 3 points.
9. The team with the higher score at the end of the game wins, and the losing team is eliminated in the second round.
10. There is one participant per round, and the bracket is decided before the game starts.
Progress Result

Round	Participant	Target / Declaration	Result	KAIST	YONSEI
1				Heo Sung-bum	Kim Ki-hong
1	Heo Sung-bum	1 / 2, 9, 14	Correct	1	0
1	Heo Sung-bum	7 / 4, 6, 10	Correct	2	0
1	Kim Ki-hong	9 / 3, 11, 12	False	2	0
1	10 second chance exceeded				
1	Kim Ki-hong	9 / 3, 7, 12	Correct	2	1
2				So Hyun-ji	Cho Hyun-jun
2	Cho Hyun-jun	9 / 3, 7, 11	Correct	2	2
2	So Hyun-ji	4 / 1, 10, 12	Correct	3	2
2	Cho Hyun-jun	6 / 2, 6, 15	Correct	3	3
3				Choi Seo-yeon	Park Na-yoon
3	Choi Seo-yeon	8 / 1, 2, 7	Correct	4	3
3	Park Na-yoon	2 / 3, 14, 15	Correct	4	4
3	Choi Seo-yeon	5 / 4, 6, 11	Correct	5	4
4				Yang Jun-hyuk	Son Ju-hyung
4	Son Ju-hyung	5 / 4, 8, 13	Correct	5	5
4	Yang Jun-hyuk	2 / 1, 7, 10	Correct	6	5
4	Yang Jun-hyuk	3 / 3, 9 11, 15	False	6	5
4	Son Ju-hyung	3 / 2, 6, 11, 15	Correct	6	6
5				Heo Sung-bum	Cho Hyun-jun
5	Cho Hyun-jun	8 / 1, 4, 9	Correct	6	9

==== Day 3: Match & Mix ====
Instruction
1. Match and Mix is a competition to find more pairs of number chips on a moving tile board.
2. The game board has a total of eight tiles, excluding one of the nine spaces that are empty. There are twenty pairs of numbered chips from 1 to 20 on the entire game board.
3. Before the game starts, number chips are revealed to participants for 10 seconds starting from the first tile board, giving them time to memorize them.
4. When the game starts, the player who goes first must flip over two number chips within 10 seconds to check. If the chip is the same number, you get 1 point, and you can flip the number chip once more. If the chips are not the same number or time runs out, the opportunity passes to the opponent.
5. Participants must move one tile after their turn, and returning to the previous position is prohibited.
6. The game is played in this way, and the team that scores 11 points first wins the round. A total of 3 rounds will be played, with rounds 1 and 2 being 2:2 and round 3 being 1:1. However, participants in the first round cannot participate in the second round in a row.
7. In the first round, the team that lost in the previous round chooses to play first, using dice.
8. Hidden rule: Revealed before the start of round 3. If you find two chips with the same number, the tile board is moved without any additional acquisition opportunities and the opportunity is immediately passed to your opponent. Even if the same chip is not found, the tile board is moved.
Progress Result

Round 1

13 17 16 20 8	9 1 17 4 15	5 14 11 19 7
6 18 12 3 7	1 10 14 12 20	9 2 15 13 4
5 10 11 19 2	3 18 8 6 16	

Turn	Yonsei University (1st) Cho Hyun-jun & Park Na-yoon		Korea University (2nd) Kim Jung-min & Lee Dong-kyu	
Turn	Choice	Points		Choice
1	6 – 6; 11 – 11; 18 – 18; 17 – 17; 4 – 4; 15 -15; 5 – 5; 20 – 20; Time Out	8	1	3 -3; 14 - Time Out
2	14 – 14; 7 – 7; 13 – 13	11	1	
	Win (1)		Lose (0)	

Round 2

20 14 16 10 8	11 18 20 7 5	4 12 15 19 1
9 3 8 15 12	11 2 6 9 17	13 17 18 1 3
4 19 6 5 10	16 13 2 7 14	

Turn	Yonsei University (2nd) Kim Ki-hong & Son Ju-hyung		Korea University (1st) Chae Seung-min & Lee Ji-soo	
Turn	Choice	Points		Choice
1	11 – 11; 7 – 7; 15 - Time Out	2	4	20 – 20; 14 – 14; 16 – 16; 8 – 8; 11 - Time Out
2	2 – 2; 1 – 1; 4 – 18	4	6	15 – 15; 9 – 9; 2 – 1
3	18 – 18; 19 – 13	5	7	19 – 19; 13 – 12
4	4 – 4; 17 – 5	6	7	5 – 10
5	5 – 5; 3 – 6	7	11	13 – 13; 10 – 10; 6 – 6; 12 – 12
	Lose (1)		Win (1)	

Round 3

3 9 10 14 5	20 12 2 7 19	12 4 3 11 15
20 16 13 8 1	14 17 16 4 7	13 8 10 7 18
2 6 15 9 17	5 18 11 19 6	

Turn	Yonsei University (1st) Park Na-yoon		Korea University (2nd) Chae Seung-min	
Turn	Choice	Points		Choice
1	9 -9	1	1	7 – 7
2	10 – 18	1	2	2 – 2
3	5 - Time Out	1	3	5 – 5
4	13 – 14	1	4	12 – 12
5	4 – 4	2	5	3 – 3
6	13 – 14	2	6	13 – 13
7	15 - Time Out	2	7	15 – 15
8	20 - Time Out	2	8	14 – 14
9	Time Out	2	9	20 – 20
10	18 – 18	3	10	8 – 8
11			11	19 – 19
	Lose (1)		Win (2)	

==== Day 4: Rotation! Rock Paper Scissors ====
Instruction
1. Rotation! Rock, Paper, Scissors is a competition in which players must roll dice with two symbols of rock, paper, scissors on them to beat their opponent on the game board.
2. Before the game starts, a dice development diagram depicting rock, paper, scissors, scissors is shown to participants for two minutes and is not revealed again after that.
3. Each round, the players and dice development changes.
4. When the match begins, rock-paper-scissors dice are placed on the starting surface of the 7×7 game board.
5. Throw a dice with only 3, 4, and 5 marked on it and rotate the dice to move the game board by the number shown. The dice can freely move up, down, left, and right by the corresponding number, but they cannot return to the path they took just before.
6. Once the dice movement is complete, check the result with the side that touches the game board. If you win you get 1 point, if you draw there is no change, if you lose you get 1 point deducted.
7. The time limit for one turn is 20 seconds, and if you fail to turn the dice within 20 seconds, 1 point is deducted.
8. One round ends when 4 points are earned, and as a result of 5 rounds, the team that wins 3 rounds first advances to the finals.
9. You cannot move to the starting point.
Strategy
- Keep the surface in contact with the floor

The number of moves according to the dice is one of 3, 4, or 5, and for each number of moves, there is a path that fixes the surface in contact with the floor. For 3, '1 space up, down, left, and right', for 4, '2 spaces up, down, left, and right/4 spaces' and '2 spaces diagonally', and for 5, 'after moving 2 spaces up, down, left, and right/diagonally (not in conflict with the 3 space movement path). This corresponds to '1 space up, down, left and right'. Due to the nature of this operation, you only need to know the bottom side of the Rock, Paper, Scissors dice, so it is virtually a sure-win strategy.

- Cornering

If you drive the dice to the edge of the diagonal corner, the path through which the opponent can score is reduced compared to the center. This is a strategy that can be used to try to consolidate in a situation where there is a difference in scores or to buy time to re-memorize the development plan.

- SNU development map memorization strategy

Also known as 'Song Hyun-seok's left hand rule. Like Fleming's left hand rule and Fleming's right hand rule, this is a method of memorizing information in the fingers. Find the vertices corresponding to thumb-scissors, index finger-rock, and middle finger-sword and move your hand to match the shape of the currently placed dice. To put it simply, it is a strategy where you think you are holding dice in your hand. The downside is that it can be confusing to move your hands around due to limitations in physical structure. Meanwhile, Jung Hyun-bin used a strategy of memorizing the four sides (two pairs of rock, paper, scissors) first.

Progress Result

Board Development Table
	1	2	3	4	5	6	7
A	Scissors	Rock	Paper	Scissors	Paper	Rock	Scissors
B	Paper	Scissors	Rock	Rock	Scissors	Paper	Paper
C	Rock	Scissors	Paper	Paper	Rock	Rock	Scissors
D	Scissors	Paper	Rock	Paper	Scissors	Paper	Rock
E	Paper	Rock	Rock	Scissors	Paper	Paper	Paper
F	Rock	Scissors	Scissors	Paper	Rock	Paper	Scissors
G	Rock	Scissors	Rock	Scissors	Rock	Scissors	Rock

Dice Development Table
Round 1			Round 2			Round 3		
	Rock			Rock			Scissors	
Paper	Rock	Scissors	Scissors	Scissors	Paper	Paper	Paper	Scissors
	Scissors			Paper			Rock	
	Paper			Rock			Rock	

Game Progress

Round 1
Turn	1st turn: Kyung Do-hyun				2nd turn: David			
Turn	Moves	Top side	Result	Points	Moves	Top side	Result	Points
1	5, Down-Down-Down-Down-Left	Red Rock	Win	1	5, Time Out	Red Rock	Lose	-1
2	3, Right-Down-Left	Red Rock	Win	2	3, Up-Right-Up	Yellow Paper	Lose	-2
3	5, Right-Up-Left-Left-Left	Red Rock	Lose	1	4, Down-Right-Right-Right		Draw	-2
4	2, Right-Right-Up-Up		Win	2	5, Left-Left-Down-Right-Right		Lose	-3
5	3, Left-Down-Right		Win	3	3, Down-Left-Left		Lose	-4
6	4, Up-Up-Left-Left		Win	4				
Final result	Do-hyun wins							

Round 2
Turn	2nd turn: Janice				2nd turn: Song Hyun-seok			
Turn	Moves	Top side	Result	Points	Moves	Top side	Result	Points
1	3, Down-Down-Down		Tie	0	4, Right-Right-Up-Up		Win	1
2	4, Left-Left-Down-Left		Lose	-1	5, Right-Right-Down-Down-Down		Tie	1
3	3, Right-Down-Left		Lose	-2	5, Right-Up-Left-Up-Up		Lose	0
4	5, Down-Down-Down-Left-Up		Win	-1	3, Down-Right-Up		Tie	0
5	4, Right-Down-Right-Right		Win	0	4, Up-Up-Up-Up		Tie	0
6	5, Left-Left-Down-Down-Down		Tie	0	5, Up-Up-Left-Left-Left		Win	1
7					5, Down-Right-Up-Right-Right		Tie	1
8	5, Down-Down-Down-Down-Down		Win	1	5, Right-Up-Left-Left-Left		Win	2
9	5, Left-Left-Up-Right-Right		Tie	1	4, Up-Up-Left-Left		Win	3
10	3, Down-Right-Up		Lose	0	3, Down-Left-Up		Win	4
Final result	Hyun-seok wins							

Round 3
Turn	1st turn: Jung Hyun-bin				2nd turn: Sky			
Turn	Moves	Top side	Result	Points	Moves	Top side	Result	Points
1	4, Down-Down-Right-Right	Yellow Rock	Win	1	4, Left-Down-Left-Up	Green Paper	Tie	0
2	3, Down-Right-Up	Green Paper	Win	2	4, out of time		Lose	-1
3	5, Down-Right-Up-Left-Left	Green Rock	Win	3	4, Down-Down-Down-Right	Red Paper	Win	0
4	5, Right-Up-Left-Down-Down	Red Scissors	Win	4				
Final result	Hyun-bin wins							

Brain Games of Season 2

=== Benefit Match ===
==== Day 1 : Ace Selection ====
Instruction
1. All participants solve the same problem and select TOP 1.
2. One cycle consists of four problems, starting at 120 seconds and the time limit decreases by 10 seconds with each cycle.
3. Participants who cannot solve a problem within the time limit or enter an incorrect answer are eliminated.
4. Strong benefits are given to the team that belongs to the TOP 1 of the Ace Selection Tournament.
5. The four types of problems given in the Ace Selection # Tournament are 'either/or', 'area ranking', 'pixel number 2', and 'zero sum game'.
Types of Problems

either/or

1. Two arithmetic problems (addition of five 3-digit numbers) are presented on the screen.
2. Compare the sum of two formulas and enter the result of the larger formula within the time limit.

area ranking

1. Four areas divided into four sections are revealed on the screen.
2. Enter the areas in order within the time limit, starting with the area that occupies the larger area.

pixel number 2

1. Six pixel cards each in red and blue are revealed on the screen.
2. Combine the red pixel cards together, exclude the part occupied by the blue pixel card, and enter the completed two-digit number within the time limit.

zero sum game

1. A total of 18 numbers with absolute values from 1 to 9 are displayed on the screen.
2. After memorizing for a limited time, enter the position of the number that becomes 0 when combined with the number given in the problem.
Progress Result

Round		Eliminated Participants	
First Cycle (120 seconds)	1R	MIT	Lee Da-eun
First Cycle (120 seconds)	1R	SNU	Jo Jun-hyeong
First Cycle (120 seconds)	1R	KAIST	Choi Yu-chan
First Cycle (120 seconds)	1R	POSTECH	Lee Ju-yeong
First Cycle (120 seconds)	2R	KU	Lee Hyun-seung
First Cycle (120 seconds)	3R	OXFORD	Lee Seung-chan
First Cycle (120 seconds)	3R	OXFORD	Choi Won-jin
First Cycle (120 seconds)	3R	YONSEI	Yang Hyun-seung
First Cycle (120 seconds)	3R	POSTECH	Choi Jin-hyeon
First Cycle (120 seconds)	4R	OXFORD	Jang Mun-hyeok
First Cycle (120 seconds)	4R	KU	Seo Ha-eun
First Cycle (120 seconds)	4R	KU	Choi Sung-hyeon
First Cycle (120 seconds)	4R	KAIST	Oh Hyung-seok
First Cycle (120 seconds)	4R	POSTECH	Ha Min-su
Second Cycle (110 seconds)	5R	—N/a	
Second Cycle (110 seconds)	6R	SNU	Woo Su-han
Second Cycle (110 seconds)	7R	YONSEI	Lee Seung-chan
Second Cycle (110 seconds)	7R	YONSEI	Im Jeong-hoon
Second Cycle (110 seconds)	8R	MIT	Park Min-seok
Second Cycle (110 seconds)	8R	MIT	Jeon Hyeon-woo
Second Cycle (110 seconds)	8R	MIT	Heo Seo-yoon
Third Cycle (100 seconds)	9R	—N/a	
Third Cycle (100 seconds)	10R	—N/a	
Third Cycle (100 seconds)	11R	KU	Kang Ra-el
Third Cycle (100 seconds)	11R	POSTECH	Jeon Ji-sung
Third Cycle (100 seconds)	12R	OXFORD	Ha Eun
Third Cycle (100 seconds)	12R	KAIST	Park Ji-sung
Fourth Cycle (90 seconds)	13R	—N/a	
Fourth Cycle (90 seconds)	14R	YONSEI	Park Se-hwan
Fourth Cycle (90 seconds)	15R	—N/a	
Fourth Cycle (90 seconds)	16R	—N/a	
Fifth Cycle (80 seconds)	17R	—N/a	
Fifth Cycle (80 seconds)	18R	—N/a	
Fifth Cycle (80 seconds)	19R	—N/a	
Fifth Cycle (80 seconds)	20R	—N/a	
Sixth Cycle (70 seconds)	21R	SNU	Yook Jun-hyeong
Sixth Cycle (70 seconds)	22R	KAIST	Hwang Gi-hyeon
Sixth Cycle (70 seconds)	23R	—N/a	
Sixth Cycle (70 seconds)	24R	—N/a	
Seventh Cycle (60 seconds)	25R	—N/a	
Seventh Cycle (60 seconds)	26R	—N/a	
Seventh Cycle (60 seconds)	27R	—N/a	
Seventh Cycle (60 seconds)	28R	SNU	Kim Gyu-min

== Awards and nominations ==
Year	Award	Category	Nominee(s)	Result	Ref.
2024	ContentAsia Awards	Best Asian Original Game Show	University War	Nominated	
