= BSHS =

BSHS may be:

- Ballston Spa High School, Ballston Spa, New York
- Beerwah State High School, Beerwah, Queensland, Australia
- Big Sky High School, Missoula, Montana
- Bishop Shanahan High School, Downingtown, Pennsylvania
- Bishop Stang High School, Dartmouth, Massachusetts
- Boiling Springs High School (disambiguation)
- Brisbane State High School, Australia
- The British Society for the History of Science
- Bryan Station High School, Lexington, Kentucky
- Busan Science High School, South Korea
