= Hyung-joon =

- Hangul: 형준
- RR: Hyeongjun
- MR: Hyŏngjun

Hyung-joon, also spelled Hyung-jun or Hyong-jun, is a Korean given name.

== People ==
- Jonathan Kim (born Kim Hyung-joon, 1960), South Korean film producer
- Park Heong-joon (born 1960), South Korean politician
- Kim Hyeong-jun (born 1968), South Korean film director
- Im Hyung-joon (born 1974), South Korean actor
- Kim Joon (born Kim Hyung-joon, 1984), South Korean actor and rapper
- Hangzoo (born Yoon Hyung-joon, 1986), South Korean rapper, member of hip-hop group Rhythm Power
- Kim Hyung-jun (born 1987), South Korean actor and singer, member of boy band SS501
- Joo Hyong-jun (born 1991), South Korean speed skater

== Fictional characters ==
- Kang Hyung-joon, in 2012 South Korean television series Missing You
- Lee Hyung-joon, in 2013 South Korean television series Who Are You?

== See also ==
- List of Korean given names
- Park Hyung-jun (박형진; born 1983), South Korean triple jumper
