= KMO =

KMO may refer to:

- Kemayoran railway station, a railway station in Jakarta, Indonesia
- Knowledge Master Open, a semiannual worldwide academic competition
- Korean Mathematical Olympiad, a competition in South Korea
- KMO (gene), which encodes the enzyme kynurenine 3-monooxygenase
- Manokotak Airport, a state-owned airport in Alaska, IATA code KMO
- KKMO, a Tacoma, Washington based radio station that once held the callsign KMO
