= ISHS =

ISHS may refer to:

- Idaho State Historical Society
- Indooroopilly State High School
- Innisfail State High School
- International Society for Horticultural Science
- International Society for Humor Studies
- Islamic State Health Service
- Incheon Science High School
