= Kirikkale Science High School =

Boarding school in Turkey

Coordinates: 39°52′38″N 32°48′25″E

KFL Logo. Kirikkale Science High School is ranked within the top 50 high schools in Turkey.

Kirikkale Science High School (Turkish: Kırıkkale Fen Lisesi) is a public boarding high school in Kirikkale, Turkey with a curriculum concentrated on natural sciences and mathematics. Science High Schools (Turkish: Fen Lisesi - FL) are public boarding high schools in Turkey aimed to train exceptionally talented students on a curriculum concentrated on natural sciences and mathematics. Kirikkale Science High School is ranked within the top 50 high schools in Turkey based on the success of its students in the national university entrance examination. The school admits 96 students annually. The prospective students are selected upon their performance in the national high school entrance examination with a 99.2 percentile ranking. The admissions to the science high school are through a competitive national high school entrance examination.

The first science high school was established in 1964 in Ankara with a funding from the Ford Foundation. The school was modeled after the American counterparts like the Bronx High School of Science. Due to the considerable success of its alumni in all aspects of professional life and academia, science high school concept is spread around the country and now there are public and private science high schools in all major cities. Being one of them Kirikkale Science High School is now one of the most prominent science high schools in Turkey.

The language of education is Turkish with English as a second language. Emphasis is given to mathematics and natural sciences including physics, chemistry and biology in the curriculum. There are also selective courses on advanced topics in physics, chemistry, biology, mathematics and analytical geometry.

The school has an optional boarding system with a comprehensive study program. These programs include four hours of etude sections every day divided into morning and afternoon sessions under the supervision of faculty members.

== See also ==
- Science High School (disambiguation)
