= Dukwon High School =

High school in Daegu, South Korea

Dukwon High School 덕원고등학교 德元高等學校

Location
- 37, Uksu-gil; Suseong-gu, Daegu; South Korea
- Coordinates: 35.8250°N 128.7064°E

Information
- Type: Private school
- Motto: Nurture great ambitions and build strength 큰 뜻을 품고 힘을 기르자
- Established: 1978
- Principal: Kyung-hak Seo (서경학)
- Faculty: approx. 85
- Grades: 10-12
- Gender: Co-educational (classes divided by gender)
- Enrollment: approx. 1,001
- Average class size: approx. 27.8 students
- Student to teacher ratio: approx. 13:1
- Campus: Suburban
- Newspaper: Dukwon
- Tree: Zelkova
- Song: Untitled(Dukwon of Cradle)
- Foundation: Dukwon Education Foundation
- Website: https://dukwon.dge.hs.kr

Dukwon High School (also known as Dukwon, or Dukwon HS; 덕원고등학교, 덕원고; 德元高等學校) is a private preparatory school in Suseong-gu, Daegu, South Korea. The school's motto is "Nurture great ambitions and build strength" and, its symbol is the zelkova tree. Like most schools in Korea, Dukwon High School starts its school year in March, starts its second semester in August, and ends the school year in February. There is a weeklong spring break in mid-February.

== History ==
=== Origins ===
On August 24, 1978, Dr. Jin-won Kim was approved to establish an education foundation, Dukwon Education Foundation, and on February 28, 1980, the new school building was completed in Hwanggeum-dong, Suseong-gu, Daegu. On March 1 of 1980, the first Principal Byeong-sip Seo was inaugurated, and on March 5 the first freshman entered. At this time, 10 classes per grade were accredited and the number of classes continued to increase. 21 years after the school was established, the plan to change the location was approved. The groundbreaking ceremony was held on April 27, 2001. On February 28, 2002, it was moved to 37, Uksu-gil, Suseong-gu, Daegu. In the same year, Cheongramsa (청람사; 靑藍舍), dormitory was opened.

== Admissions ==
By the law of private school education, Dukwon High School was selected to be a privately operated high school above numerous other schools. The students who have a higher GPA than other students in their middle school can apply to Dukwon High School.

== Notable alumni ==
- Hyeon Taeghwan '80, chemist, director of IBS, Associate Editor of Journal of the American Chemical Society
- Sang-hyuk Jung '80, CEO of Shinhan Bank
- Jeong-su Kim '80, Lieutenant General, Superintendent of Korea Military Academy
- Kyung-cheol Park '80, doctor, writer of 'A Beautiful Walk with Rustic Doctor(시골의사의 아름다운 동행)'
- Seong-yong Youn '82, Director General of National Museum of Korea, former Director of National Folk Museum of Korea
- An-su Park '83, general, Chief of Staff of the Republic of Korea Army
- Cheol-ho Heo '83, CEO of Korea Ginseng Corporation
- Hoon-ki Lee '83, CEO of Lotte Chemical, President & CEO of Lotte Group Chemical Unit
- Duk-geun Ahn '84, The Minister of Trade, Industry and Energy of the Republic of Korea
- Ji-man Hong '84, Secretary for Political Affairs of Office of the President (South Korea), former journalist, former member of the National Assembly of the Republic of Korea
- Sung-soo Kwon '87, Presiding Judge of Seoul Central District Court
- Seok-woo Kim '88, President of Institute of Justice of the Republic of Korea
- Jin-su Bae '97, comics artist, creator of 'Money Game(머니게임)'
- Won-ho Shin 2001, Daegu Metropolitan City Chairman of the Basic Income Party
- Jae-won Lee 2002, actor
- E Sens (Min-ho Kang) 2003, rapper
- Seo-yeon Cho (Natalie Cho) 2004, news presenter of Yonhap News Agency
- Kang-hyun Park 2006, actor
