= Park Hyung-jun =

South Korean triple jumper

Personal information
- Full name: Park Hyung-jun
- Nationality: South Korea
- Born: 29 April 1983 (age 43) Gyeongsangbuk-do, South; Korea
- Height: 1.80 m (5 ft 11 in)
- Weight: 70 kg (154 lb)

Korean name
- Hangul: 박형진
- RR: Bak Hyeongjin
- MR: Pak Hyŏngjin

Sport
- Sport: Athletics
- Event: Triple jump

Achievements and titles
- Personal best: Triple jump: 16.66 (2004)

Park Hyung-jun (Korean: 박형진; born April 29, 1983, in Gyeongsangbuk-do) is a South Korean triple jumper. He represented South Korea at the 2004 Summer Olympics, and also spanned his best jump of 16.66 metres from the men's college national championships at Chungbuk Science High School in Jecheon.

Park qualified for the South Korean squad in the men's triple jump at the 2004 Summer Olympics in Athens. Four months before the Games, he set a career personal best and an Olympic B-standard jump of 16.66 metres at the college national championships in Jecheon to secure a berth on the South Korean athletics team. Park got off to a rugged start with a foul until he spanned a top qualifying jump of 15.84 on his second attempt, falling short of a personal best by 82 centimetres. Since his third jump spurred another foul, Park ended up in thirty-ninth against an immense roster of forty-eight athletes, and did not advance past the qualifying round.
