= Jeonbuk Science High School =

Coordinates: 36°00′52″N 127°02′08″E

- 전북과학고등학교
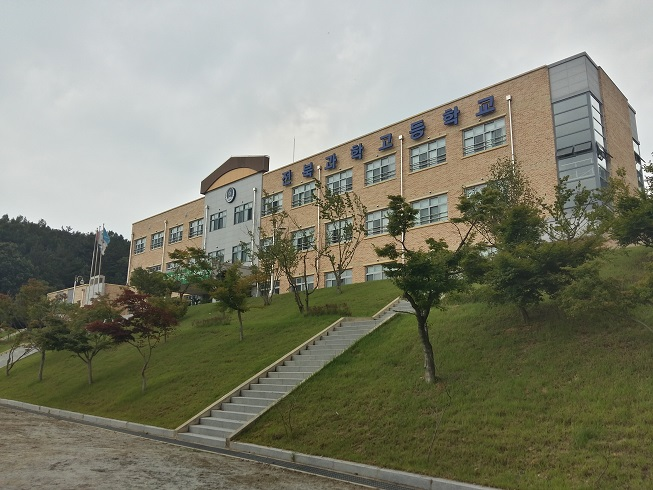
- Jeonbuk Science High School in 2007
- Iksan, Jeollabukdo; South Korea

Information
- Type: Science High School
- Motto: Sincerity, Research, Harmony
- Established: 1991
- President: Jin-Suk Hong
- Staff: 21
- Enrollment: 136
- Newspaper: Newton and Shakespere (N&S)
- Website: http://www.ejbs.hs.kr

Jeonbuk Science High School (JBSH; Korean: 전북과학고등학교; Hanja: 全北科學高等學敎; RR: Jeonbuk Gwahak Godeunghakgyo) is a science high school located in Iksan, North Jeolla Province, South Korea.

== History ==
The school was established on 1 March 1991 with Choi Byeung Sun as the first president.

== Entrance ==
There is an entrance test annually in October. Top 3% grade students in Middle School (Equivalent to GCSE in the U.K.) can apply Jeonbuk Science High School.

== Events ==
- The music festival Starry Night is held annually in July.
- The winter festival Han Gyeol Festival is held annually in December.
- The school year book Gyeol is published annually in December.
- The school newspaper Newton & Shakespeare is published every three months.
- The school Science Thesis competition is held in December.
