= Boiling Springs High School =

Boiling Springs High School is the name for several schools including:

- Boiling Springs High School (Pennsylvania)
- Boiling Springs High School (South Carolina)
