= Chungbuk Science High School =

- 충북과학고등학교 / 충북과학고
- Chungbuk Gwahak Godeung Hakgyo

Location
- Mountain 4-23, Sangya-ri, Gadeok-myeon, Cheongwon-gun, Chungbuk; South Korea; 36°35′18″N 127°34′10″E

Information
- Type: Public magnet high school
- Established: 19 December 1988
- Website: www.cbs.hs.kr

Chungbuk Science High School is a special-purpose public school for students aged 15–18, located in the province of Chungcheongbuk-do, South Korea. The school is a science high school for gifted students in mathematics and science. It opened on March 6, 1989.

The school's motto is "Humanity (인격, 人格), Creativity (창의, 創意), Sincerity (성실, 誠實)".

== History ==
- 1988. 4. 13. Ministry of Culture and Education approved to establish Chungbuk Science High School
- 1988. 11. 17. First entrance exam (capacity : 60 people)
- 1989. 3. 1. Inauguration of KeonSu Son (손건수), as the first principal
- 1989. 3. 6. First entrance ceremony
- 1991. 2. 12. First completion ceremony
- 1991. 3. 1. Inauguration of ByeongHak Kim (김병학), as the second principal
- 1991. 6. 15. CheongWun Dorm.(청운학사) Constructed
- 1994. 3. 1. Inauguration of HyukJung Yun (윤혁중), as the third principal
- 1997. 9. 1. Inauguration of EunDu Lee (이은두), as the 4th principal
- 1999. 3. 1. Changing capacity of one grade to 46 people
- 1999. 9. 1. Inauguration of DeokGue Lee (이덕규), as the 5th principal
- 2000. 9. 1. Inauguration of GyuTak Yeon (연규탁), as the 6th principal
- 2003. 9. 1. Inauguration of JongTae Lee (이종태), as the 7th principal
- 2004. 3. 1. Remodeling reading room
- 2004. 12. 22. Remodeling CheongWun Dorm.
- 2005. 9. 1 Inauguration of ChungHwan Seon (손충환), as the 8th principal
- 2006. 8. 14 Remodeling Physics and Earth Science Lab.
- 2007. 2. 28 Remodeling Chemistry and Biology Lab.
- 2007. 2. 28 Remodeling Library
- 2009. 3. 1 Inauguration of Jinwan Kim (김진완), as the 9th principal
- 2010. 2. 11 19th graduation ceremony and 20th early graduation ceremony (369 and 555 people total)
- 2010. 3. 1 Inauguration of Hee Jeong (정희), as the 10th principal
