= Gyeonggibuk Science High School =

School in Uijeongbu, South Korea

Coordinates: 37°45′31″N 127°01′10″E

- Hangul: 경기북과학고등학교
- Hanja: 京畿北科學高等學校
- RR: Gyeonggibuk gwahak godeunghakgyo
- MR: Kyŏnggibuk kwahak kodŭnghakkyo

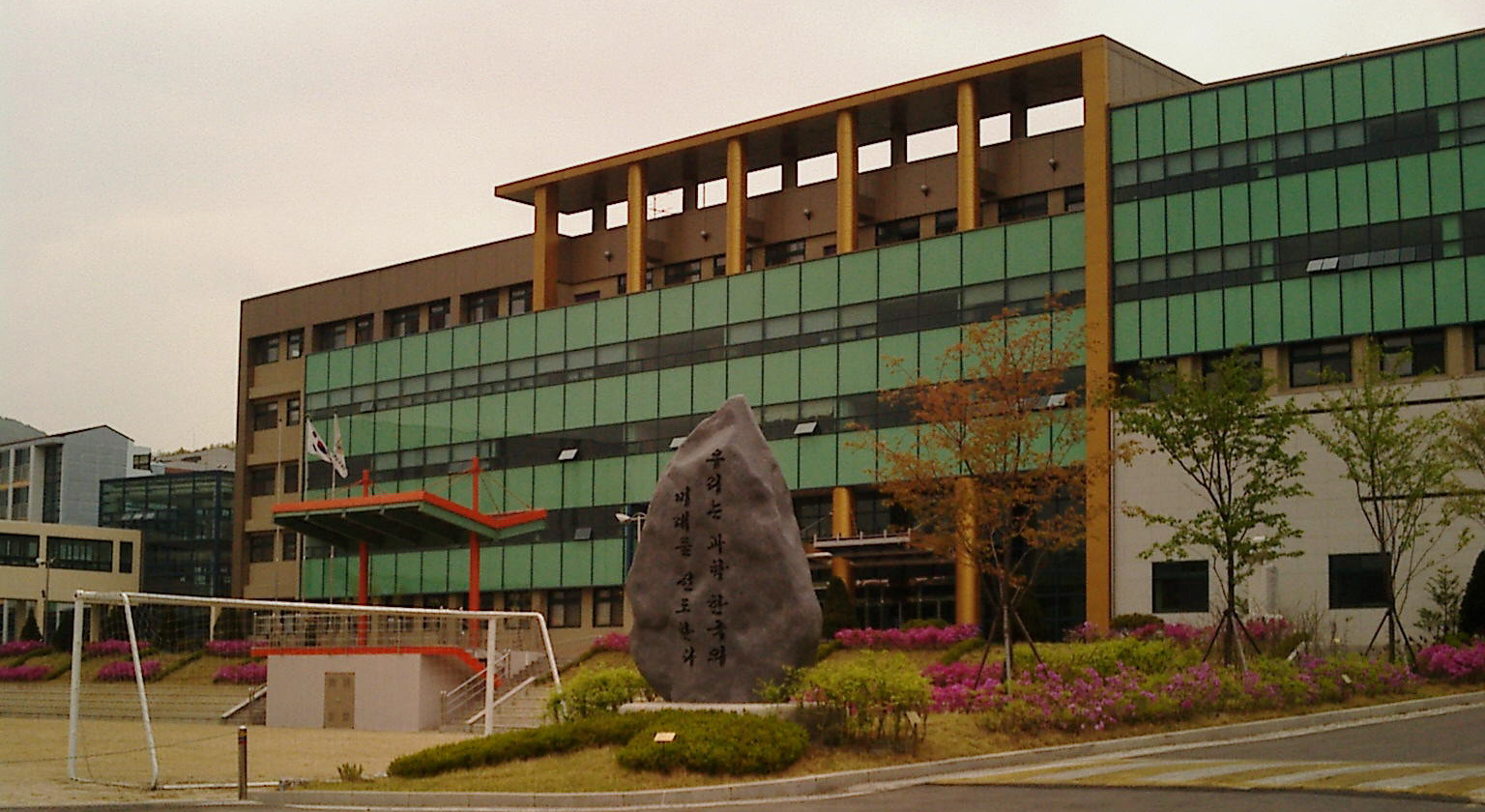
The main building of GBS (taken in August 2002

Gyeonggibuk Science High School (GBS, Korean: 경기북과학고등학교) is a science high school in Uijeongbu, Republic of Korea, established in 2005. It was called Uijeongbu Science High School(UIS) before January 7, 2008. Some Korean students called GBS "Uigwak" which is from the pronunciation of UIS. There are about 230 students with most going on to university in the second year. GBS covers an area of 25,000 m^{2} with 18 classrooms and 16 laboratories. All students live in the dormitory, two students to a room.

== Achievements in Olympiads ==
- 2006 : The 14th International Environmental Project Olympiad
- 2006 : The 11th International Astronomy Olympiad (A gold prize)
- 2006 : The 2nd Asia-Pacific Astronomy Olympiad
- 2007 : The 12th International Astronomy Olympiad (A gold prize)
- 2008 : The 2nd International Olympiad on Astronomy and Astrophysics (A bronze medal)
- 2010 : The 18th International Environmental Project Olympiad (The grand prize)
- 2010 : The 42nd International Chemistry Olympia (A gold prize)
- 2010 : The 4th International Olympiad on Astronomy and Astrophysics (A silver medal)
- 2012 : The 6th International Olympiad on Astronomy and Astrophysics (A bronze medal)
- 2012 : The 6th Asia-Pacific Informatics Olympiad (A bronze prize)
- 2013 : The 25th International Olympiad in Informatics (A gold prize)
- 2014 : The 19th International Astronomy Olympiad (A silver prize)
- 2015 : The 9th International Olympiad on Astronomy and Astrophysics (A bronze medal)
- 2016 : The 21st International Astronomy Olympiad
- 2016 : The 10th International Olympiad on Astronomy and Astrophysics (A bronze medal)
- 2017 : The 22nd International Astronomy Olympiad (A silver prize)
- 2017 : The 11th International Olympiad on Astronomy and Astrophysics (An honorable mention)
- 2018 : The 14th Asia-Pacific Astronomy Olympiad (A bronze prize)
- 2019 : The 13th International Olympiad on Astronomy and Astrophysics
- 2019 : The 24th International Astronomy Olympiad (A silver prize)
- 2019 : The 15th Asia-Pacific Astronomy Olympiad
- 2020 : (covid-19) International Olympiad on Astronomy and Astrophysics(GeCAA) (A bronze medal)
- 2021 : The 14th International Olympiad on Astronomy and Astrophysics (A bronze medal)
- 2022 : The 15th International Olympiad on Astronomy and Astrophysics (A bronze medal)

== The mark of GBS ==
The mark of UIS(the old name of GBS)

The vertical line at the center of the crest represents a pen, which suggests that GBS should be a place of seeking after truth and should be open to all talented students. The letter "S" represents "Science," the arching black line around it symbolizes the orbit of an electron, and "●" symbolizes the atomic nucleus.

== The motto of GBS ==
- Jeolmun(절문, 切問): Digging into a problem with a good question
- Geunsa(근사, 近思): Materializing an idea to be able to practice

== Sisterly Relationship ==
In 2006, GBS set up sisterly relationship with National Hsinchu Senior High School in Taiwan
