= Gyeongsan Science High School =

High school in Gyeongsan, South Korea

Coordinates: 35°49′18″N 128°46′07″E

- 경산과학고등학교
- Gyeongsan; South Korea

Information
- Type: Public
- Motto: Deliberation and Strong Behavior
- Established: 2007
- President: Gyeong-soo Park
- Enrollment: 140
- Website: www.gss.hs.kr

- Gyeongsan Science High School
- Hangul: 경산과학고등학교
- Hanja: 慶山科學高等學校
- RR: Gyeongsan gwahak godeunghakgyo
- MR: Kyŏngsan kwahak kodŭnghakkyo

Gyeongsan Science High School (경산과학고등학교, or simply 경산과학고 or 경산과고) is a high school (ages 15–18) in Gapje-dong, Gyeongsan, South Korea. It was originally authorized as Saehan High School on 8 December, and its name was changed to Gyeongsan Science High School on 9 May 2005. It was opened on 2 March 2007 with the first entrance ceremony.

The school is for gifted students with talents in mathematics and sciences. Currently it holds 140 students (110 boys and 30 girls) with 55 teachers.
