= Korean Mathematical Olympiad =

Math olympiad in South Korea

- Genre: Mathematical olympiad
- Organized by: Korean Mathematical Society

The Korean Mathematical Olympiad is a mathematical olympiad held by the Korean Mathematical Society (KMS) in Republic of Korea.

== History ==
In 1988, only high school students were tested and middle school students were supposed to take the 'high school exam'. From the 11th exam, the middle school students' test was introduced (JKMO, Junior Korean Mathematical Olympiad). In the 53rd International Mathematical Olympiad (IMO), the Korean delegation won 209 out of 252 out of the total score and 6 gold medals and ranked the first place for the first time in history. From then, Korean mathematicians have made outstanding achievements in advanced math research and International Mathematical Olympiad.

== Business Background ==
In order to obtain excellent grades in the International Mathematics Olympiad, the Korean Mathematical Society holds the Korean Mathematical Olympiad, and through the operation of the seasonal school, KMS will discover gifted students and educate them to contribute the development of mathematics, science, and engineering in Korea.

Students who have won higher than a bronze prize in a High School Level Secondary Test or those who have completed a Middle School Level Winter School are entitled to take a Final Test. This consists of 6 questions in a narrative form. It is taken for two days at the end of March, with students required to solve 3 problems in 4 hours and 30 minutes each day. Awards are divided into Grand Prize, Excellence Prize, and Encouragement Prize, and 13 people are selected as representative candidates. Six students are selected from the candidates to represent Korea in the IMO.

== Gauss Part and Euler Part ==
Since 2017, KMO has been divided into two parts: Gauss Part and Euler Part. The Gauss Part is open to all students under the age of 20 and the Euler Part is available for high school students other than science high school students.

== Final representative selection process ==
About 12 to 13 students (twice the number of final candidates) are selected based on the grades obtained by multiplying the grades of five tests (KMO second test, Romanian Master of Mathematics, winter school mock test, APMO, and KMO final exam) by the weights set by the Korea Math Olympiad Committee. IMO mock tests are conducted for these 12 students; based on their scores, six finalists will be selected by the Korea Mathematics Olympiad Committee. The final candidates and the target students will perform the weekend training for about 5 weeks in May, and the final representative students will hold intensive training before participation in IMO, which is held from June to July.
