= Daejeon Science High School for the Gifted =

High school in Daejeon, South Korea

Coordinates: 36°22′25″N 127°22′15″E

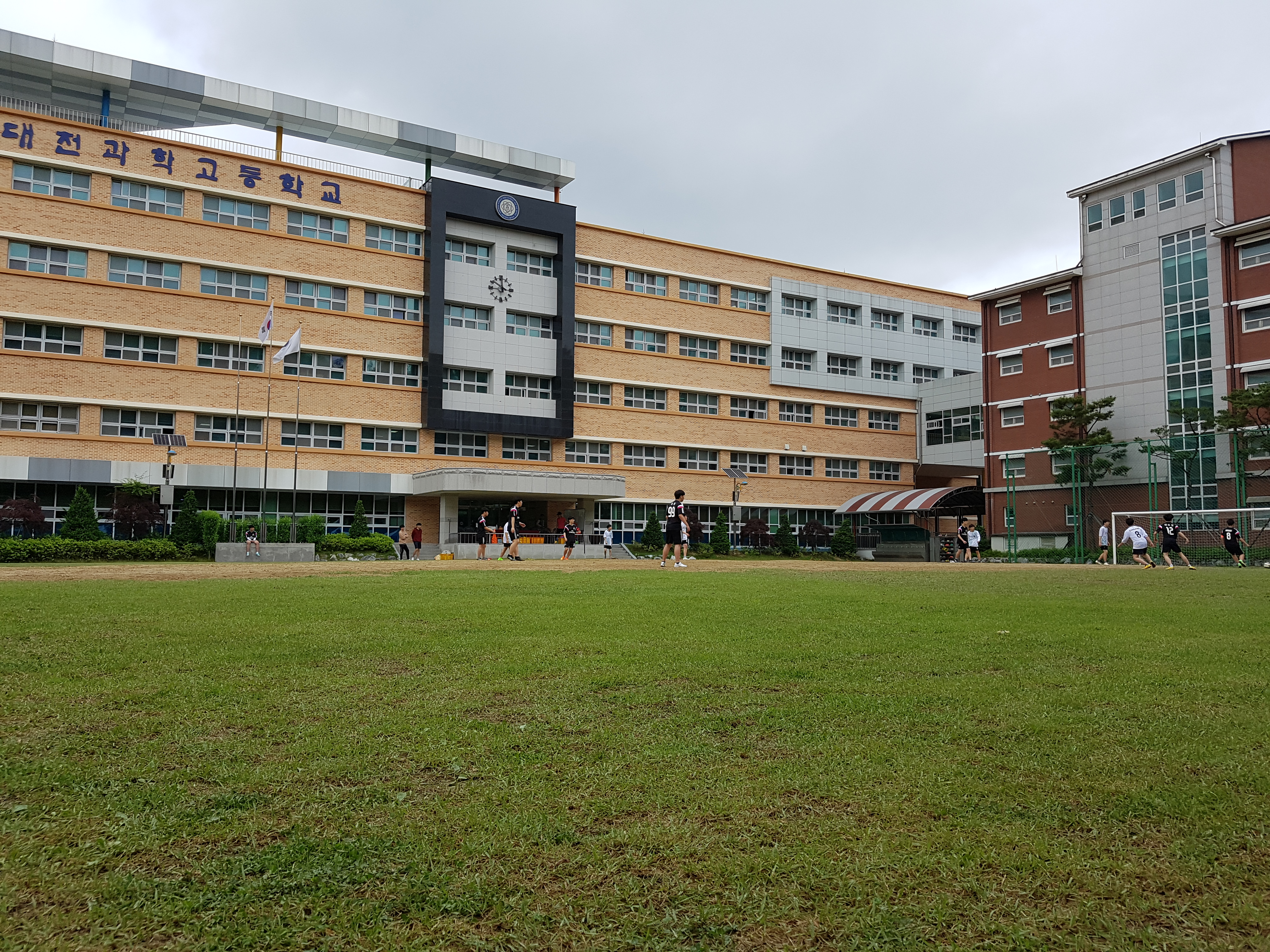
- Daejeon; South Korea

Information
- Type: Science Academy for the Gifted
- Motto: Honesty, Diligence, Creation
- Established: 1984
- President: YoungKon Song
- Faculty: 83
- Enrollment: 277
- Campus: 19-2, Guseong-dong, Yuseong-gu, Daejeon
- Website: endjshs.djsch.kr/main.do

- Daejeon Science High School for the Gifted
- Hangul: 대전과학고등학교
- Hanja: 大田科學高等學校
- RR: Daejeon gwahak godeunghakgyo
- MR: Taejŏn kwahak kodŭnghakkyo

Daejeon Science High School for the Gifted (DSHS, Korean: 대전과학고등학교) is located in Daejeon, South Korea. It was founded in 1984. The school is for gifted students with talents in mathematics and sciences.

The graduates of the school usually go to science or engineering schools in Seoul National University, KAIST and other prestigious universities in Korea and in the world, and also medical schools in Korea.

== History ==
- November 21, 1983 Official permission of school foundation (6 classrooms, 60 students)
- March 7, 1984 Opened school and took first entrance ceremony.
- January 7, 1986 Opened dormitory Yeomyung-Gwan (黎明館)
- June 11, 1992 Altering school regulations (9 classrooms in total)
- May 6, 1994 School building newly constructed in new place and moved.
- January 31, 2006 Altering school regulations (12 classrooms, 216 students)
- March 1, 2009 Altering school regulations (15 classrooms, 270 students)

== Facilities ==
- Main Building 1 (Tamui-Gwan)
  - Center office, meeting rooms, office and classrooms of math, foreign language, Korean language, social studies
  - Each classroom is also operated as a major classroom for 2nd and 3rd graders.
  - 5-story building
- Main Building 2 (Ilshin-Gwan)
  - 6 Classrooms (major classrooms for 1st graders), 4 reading rooms, library (Yeomyeongmaru), multimedia rooms, Seminar rooms, Soya art gallery, Yeomyeong story room etc.
  - 4-story building
- Hi-Tech Science Building (Dasan-Gwan)
  - The science building houses labs equipped with the latest facilities and devices
  - 7-story building, astronomical telescopes in roof
  - A center for research the engages students and professors
- Dormitories (Yeomyeong-Gwan)
  - 69 rooms in the old building (A, for 2nd, 3rd male students), 68 rooms in the new building(B, for 1st grade male students, all female students)
  - 1 Houseparent's room, 1 Exercising room, 4 Debating rooms, 2 Internet rooms (now removed)
  - A refrigerator on each floor
- Cafeteria & Gym
  - 200 seats cafeteria in 1st floor
  - Gym for basketball, badminton, table tennis, etc. in 2nd floor

== See also ==
- Education for the scientifically gifted in Korea
