= Daegu Science High School =

High school in Daegu, South Korea

Coordinates: 35.84433°N 128.62529°E

- 대구과학고등학교
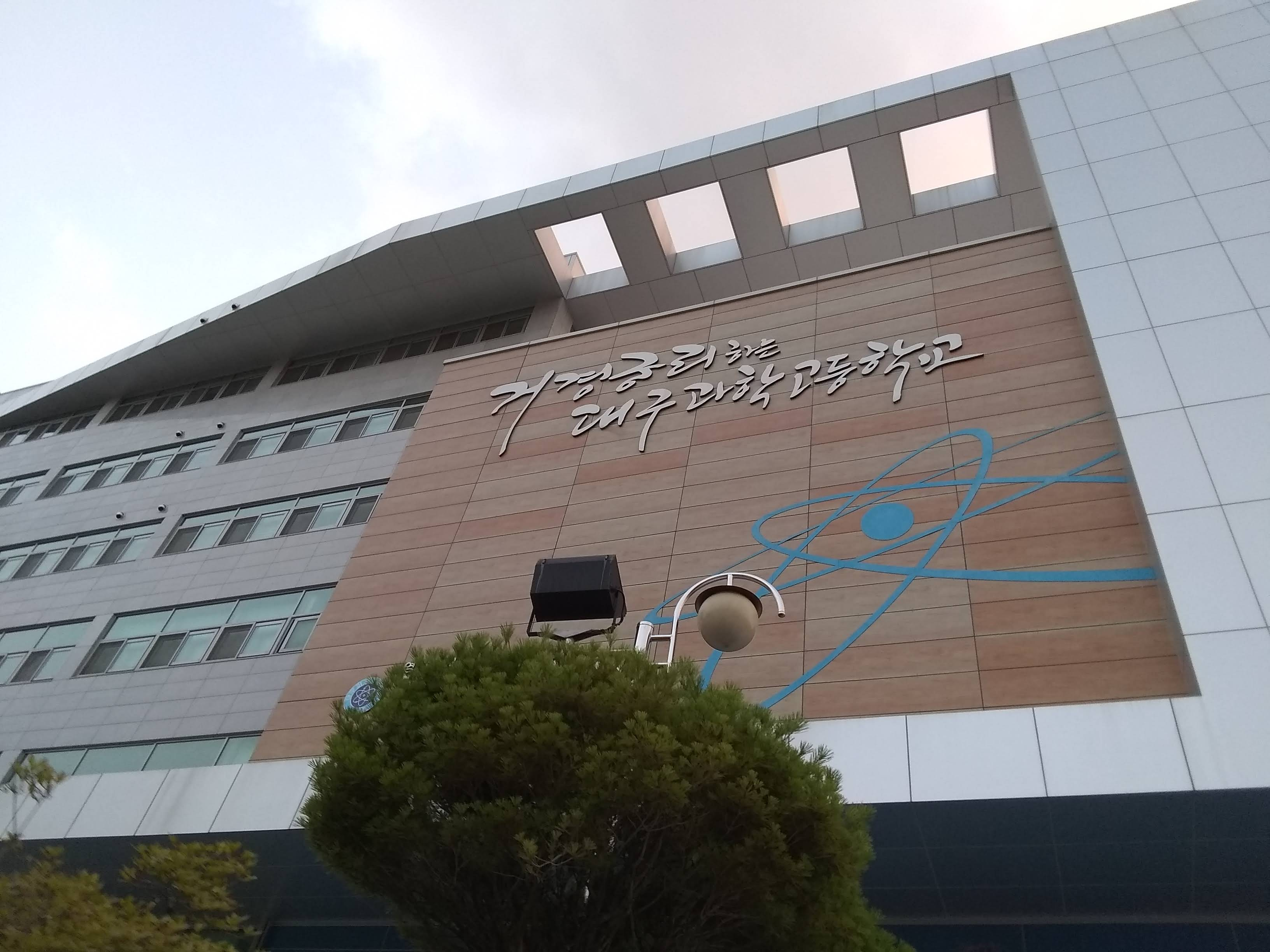
- Suseong, Daegu; South Korea

Information
- Type: Gifted School
- Established: 1987
- Enrollment: 281 (2020)
- Website: ts.hs.kr

- Daegu Science High School
- Hangul: 대구과학고등학교
- Hanja: 大邱科學高等學校
- RR: Daegu gwahak godeunghakgyo
- MR: Taegu kwahak kodŭnghakkyo

Daegu Science High School (Korean: 대구과학고등학교) is a gifted school located in Daegu, South Korea. The school opened on October 26, 1987. As of 2020, it has 281 students. The school is for gifted students with talents in mathematics and sciences. The graduates of the school usually go to science or engineering schools in KAIST, Postech, Seoul National University, and other prestigious universities in Korea and in the world.

== History ==
- October 26, 1987 – official permission of school foundation (2 classrooms, 60 students)
- March 1, 1988 – the inauguration of YoungKyun Son, as the first principal
- March 3, 1988 – the first entrance ceremony
- February 12, 1990 – moved to a newly built school
- January 28, 1991 – the first graduation ceremony (52 students)
- May 30, 1992 – altering school regulations (4 classrooms per grade, 12 classrooms in total)
- September 1, 2006 – the inauguration of Chunhyun Cho, as the eighth principal
- December 18, 2008 – transferred to a science gifted school
- February 10, 2011 – the 21st graduation ceremony (1742 early graduates in total)
- March 1, 2011 – the inauguration of Soodohn Choi, as the tenth principal
- March 1, 2019 – the inauguration of Changwon Seok, as the twelfth principal
