= Incheon Science High School =

School in Incheon, South Korea

Coordinates: 37°29′30″N 126°30′29″E

Incheon Science High School (인천과학고등학교; 仁川科學高等學校) is located in the Incheon Metropolitan Area (인천광역시), Incheon Jung-Gu (인천중구), Number 277 / 74-37 Young Jong main street (Unseo-dong:운서동 543-4).

Incheon Science High School is a magnet school; graduates of the school usually attend science and engineering colleges, for example, Seoul National University, Postech, KAIST, Hanyang University, Korea University, Yonsei University, and other prestigious universities in Korea and throughout the world, and also medical schools in Korea.

== History ==
- 19 August 1993: Official permission of Incheon Science Middle School foundation
- 1 March 1994: Inauguration of InCheol Kim as the first principal
- 3 March 1994: First entrance ceremony
- 26 September 1994: Moved to a newly built school
- 21 April 1995: Set up a sisterhood relationship with Samsung Electronics MicroCenter
- 1 November 1996: Completion of school LAN
- 1 September 1997: Building the Internet computer network
- 1 September 2001: Inauguration of GyuHo Jo as the second principal
- 1 April 2003: Work begun on official residence
- 24 October 2003: Extending an electronic library
- 2 March 2004: Eleventh entrance ceremony
- 2 December 2006: Extending a study hall on main building fourth floor
- 15 February 2007: Eleventh graduation ceremony
- 11 August 2007: Set up a sisterhood relationship with JangSa 26 middle school in Hunan Province, China
- 1 March 2008: Inauguration of YongSeop An as the third principal

== Introduction ==
=== Purpose of establishment ===
- Early detection of scientific aptitude and development of potential ability
- Establishing a foundation for producing high ranked scientific staff
- Inducement of choosing natural sciences and engineering career paths for talented students

=== Object of education ===
- JaJu (자주, independence): independent people
- ChangUi (창의, creative): creative people
- DeokSeong (덕성, virtue): virtuous people

=== Symbol of the school ===
- School tree: Pinus thunbergii (곰솔)
- School flower: Rose

인곽 오지마 진짜 제발 /진곽인입니다. 진곽도 오지마 진짜 제발

== Buildings ==
The school contains a Main building, an Outbuilding, Cheong Un Gwan (청운관 : Dormitory), Cheong Myeong Gwan (청명관 : Dormitory), and a cafeteria. Because all buildings are connected by an arcade, movement between buildings is shielded from the rain.

=== Main building ===
The main building has four floors. The classrooms for first- and second-year students and main schoolwork's have been completed.

- On the first floor are the principal's office, administrative office, advisors' and superintendent's offices, mathematics classroom, assembly hall, workshop, audiovisual room, and the Physics Olympiad room. The lobby is located in the center. Beside it are a weight room and a table tennis room.
- On the second floor, there are four classrooms for first-year students, the first-year student teachers' room, general laboratory, earth science laboratory, an admission officer's room, and a polarizing microscope room.
- On the third floor, there are four classrooms for second-year students, the second-year student teachers' room, library, computer room, audio/visual laboratory, and an outdated study hall. Also, the third floor is connected by a passage to the cafeteria and outbuilding.
- On the roof, there is an astronomical observatory.

=== Outbuilding ===
The outbuilding has four floors. There are classrooms for third-year students (also used for Gifted and Talented Education (GATE) classes)) and a room for science experiments.

- On the first floor there are the GATE office and three classrooms for third-year students.
- On the second floor are a chemical laboratory, laboratory and chemicals room.
- On the third floor are a physical laboratory, laboratory and seminar room.
- On fourth floor are a biology laboratory, general laboratory and microscope room.

=== Cheong Un Gwan (청운관) ===
This dormitory has three floors. The coed dormitory is located in the same building, but the dormitories are separated by walls. 1-2 people live in each room. Each room has two beds with a shared restroom, washroom, and a shower. Most residents are juniors, but almost twelve students are freshmen.

=== Cheong Myeong Gwan (청명관) ===
This building was built in 2009. Since November 2, all female students and some male students live in this dormitory. 2-4 people live in each room. Each room has a rest room and four beds. Only freshmen live in the building.

=== Cafeteria ===
The cafeteria is composed of two halls. Both halls were used for special lunch time, but special lunch time has been eliminated, so now only one hall is used. Each hall has two Food Distribution counters and one station to return used utensils.

== Club activity ==
There are four types of clubs which the students can join: study club, Olympiad club, the interest club, and other clubs of interest.

=== Study clubs ===
- WIN (Physics Research Club)
- Plutonium (Robot Engineering Club)
- TNT (Chemical Experiment Club)
- LOTTOL (Biochemistry Research Club)
- Bandy (Biology Research Club)
- Quasar (Astronomical observation Club)
- SaRamGwa SemTeur (사람과 셈틀, computer research Club)
- Logic (Logical Mathematics Club)
- Criticism (Logical Criticism Club)

=== Olympiad clubs ===
- Wizard (Olympiad in Informatics Club)
- CheonSuDong (천수동, Mathematics Olympiad Club)
- TIP (Physics Olympiad Club)
- Philochem (Chemistry Olympiad Club)
- Think Big (Biology Olympiad Club)
- Meteor (Earth Science Olympiad Club)

=== Interest clubs ===
- GLOBE (Aerospace Club)
- Buzzer Bitter (Basketball Club)
- Red Devils (Soccer Club)
- Fusion Entertainment (Dance Club)
- YeoHwaMuGa (여화무가, Theater Club)
- ChaRang (차랑, Group Sound Club)
- BiRyong (비룡, Cooking Club)
- iFlow (Hiphop Club)

=== Other clubs ===
- YeoDiDiYa (여디디야, Christianity Club)
- ASeoHwaRang (아서화랑, Librarian Club)
- Web Master (Website Editor Club)
- HaYanNoRae (하얀노래, A Cappella Club)
- School paper editing club
- Newspaper editing club
- KaJak (카작, Catholic Club)
- ISBN (Broadcasting Club)
- AMABILE (Chamber Music Club)

== See also ==
- Seoul Science Middle School
- Hansung Science Middle School
- Daegu Science Middle School
