= Busan Science High School =

School in Busan, South Korea

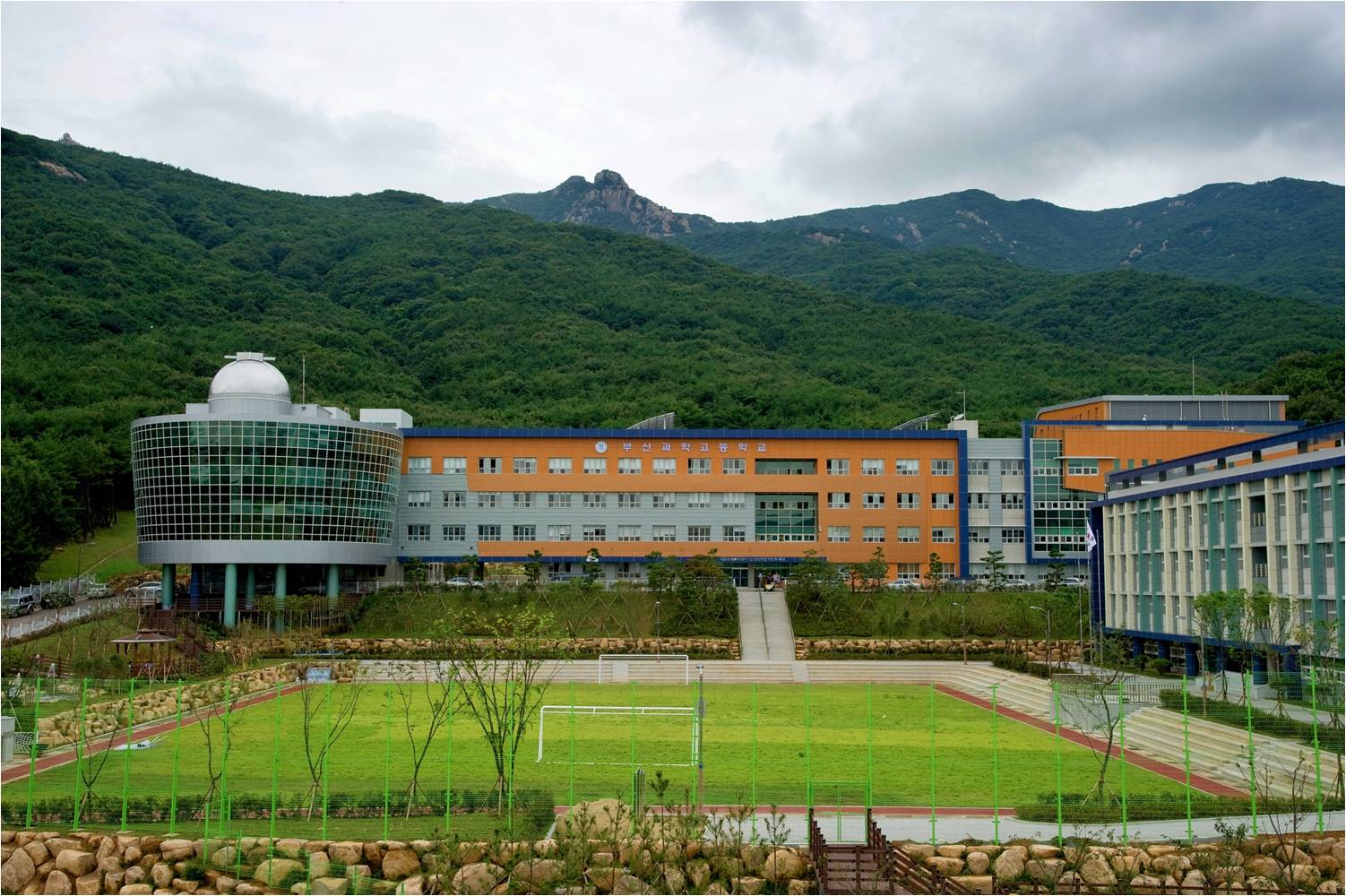
- Campus of Busan Science High School
- 455-1 Geumsaem-ro, Geumjeong-gu, Busan (Guseo-dong); South Korea

Information
- Type: Public school, Special-purpose high school
- Established: 5 March 2003
- Principal: Woo Ui Ha
- Vice-principal: Hwang Jeong Hun
- Staff: 8 (6 administration staff, 1 mechanical staff, 1 facility staff)
- Teaching staff: 47 (1 principal, 1 vice-principal, 44 teachers^{1}, 1 foreigner teacher)
- Website: www.bss.hs.kr

Korean name
- Hangul: 부산과학고등학교
- RR: Busan gwahak godeunghakgyo
- MR: Pusan kwahak kodŭnghakkyo

Busan Science High School (Korean: 부산과학고등학교) is a public science special-purpose high school located in Busan, South Korea.

== School Concepts ==
=== Establishment Background ===
It was established in order to satisfy the wishes of parents in the Busan area and to form a base for training talented students in science and technology.

== History ==
- 8 October 2002: Master plan for the school established
- 25 November 2002: The ordinance of the school foundation issued.(Jang Young Sil Science High School)
- 5 March 2003: The 1st entrance (80 freshmen)
- 18 February 2005: The 1st early Graduation (43 11th graders)
- 21 February 2006: The 1st Graduation and the 2nd Early Graduation(32 12th graders and 58 11th graders)
- 6 January 2010: Name changed to 'Busan Science High School'
- 19 August 2011: Busan Science High School has been relocated to the hew school in Guseo-dong Geumjeong-gu
- 9 February 2012: The 7th Graduation and the 8th Early Graduation (17 12th graders and 70 11th graders)
- 1 March 2016: Inauguration of the 7th principal, Woo Ui Ha
- 27 February 2018: The 16th entrance (103 freshmen)

== Curriculum ==
Division		Subject	Credit
General Subjects	Basics	Korean, Literature I, Speech & Writing I, Math, Math II, English, English I, English II	46
General Subjects	Inquiry	Korean History, Social Studies, Life Science II, Earth Science II	22
General Subjects	PE & Art	Physical Education, Music	10
General Subjects	Life & Culture	Safety&Health, IT&Computer, Second Foreign Language	12
Specialized Subjects	Math	Advanced Math I, Advanced Math II, High-level Math I, High-level Math II	26
Specialized Subjects	Science	Physics Experiment, Chemistry Experiment, Advanced Physics, Advanced Chemistry, Advanced Life Science, Advanced Earth Science, High-level Physics, High-level Chemistry, High-level Life Science, High-level Earth Science, IT&Computer II, Reading Original Texts	70
Creative Experience Activities		Autonomous Activity, Volunteer Work, Club Activity, Career Education	24
Total Number of Credits			210
