= International Student Science Fair =

The International Student Science Fair (ISSF) is an annual event providing a platform for international interaction to take place in science education. The fair brings together high school students, teachers and school leaders to share and develop the learning and teaching of science research and education. The ISSF is the major event of its type in the world, bringing together students, teachers, school and university leaders to share and develop their ideas about science in the modern world.

== History of ISSF ==
- 2005 — Mahidol Wittayanusorn School, Nakhon Pathom, Thailand (2005)
- 2006 — Korea Science Academy, Busan, Republic of Korea (August 2006)
- 2007 — City Montessori School, Lucknow, India (August 2007)
- 2008 — Ritsumeikan Senior High School, Kyoto, Japan (October 2008)
- 2009 — National Junior College, Singapore (May 2009)
- 2010 — Australian Science and Mathematics School, Adelaide, Australia (September 2010)
- 2011 — Mahidol Wittayanusorn School, Nakhon Pathom, Thailand (September 2011)
- 2012 — Fort Richmond Collegiate, Winnipeg, Canada (24-30 April 2012)
- 2013 — Camborne Science & International Academy, Camborne, United Kingdom (11-16 July 2013)
- 2014 — Moscow Chemical Lyceum, Moscow, Russian Federation (8-12 August 2014)
- 2015 — John Monash Science School, Melbourne, Australia (December 2015)
- 2016 — NUS High School of Math and Science, Singapore (May 2016)
- 2017 — Korea Science Academy, Busan, South Korea (June 2017)
- 2018 — Illinois Mathematics and Science Academy, Aurora, Illinois, United States (June 2018)
- 2019 — National Junior College, Singapore (March 2019)
- 2020 — Kamnoetvidya Science Academy, Rayong, Thailand (January 2020)
- 2021 — The High School Affiliated to the Beihang University, Beijing, China
- 2022 — Lewiston-Porter High School, Lewiston, New York, United States
- 2023 — Queensland Academy for Science, Mathematics and Technology, Australia
- 2025 — Mahidol Wittayanusorn School, Nakhon Pathom, Thailand (January 2025)

== Participating schools ==
Australia

- Australian Science and Mathematics School
- John Monash Science School
- Queensland Academy for Science, Mathematics and Technology
- Aberfoyle Park High School

Canada

- Fort Richmond Collegiate

China

- The High School affiliated to BeiHang University

Hong Kong SAR

- Ho Yu College and Primary School (Sponsored by Sik Sik Yuen)

India

- City Montessori School

Indonesia

- Budi Mulia Dua International High School
- Center for Young Scientists (affiliated to Surya University)

Iran

- Manzoumeh Kherad Institute

Japan

- Tokyo Tech High School of Science and Technology
- Ritsumeikan Junior and Senior High School
- Ritsumeikan Keisho Junior and Senior High School
- Ritsumeikan Uji High School
- Toyonaka High School

Kenya

- Brookhouse School

Macau

- Keang Peng School

Malaysia

- Alam Shah Science School
- Kepala Batas Secondary Science School

Mongolia

- New Beginning International School

Netherlands

- St.-Odulphuslyceum

Philippines

- Philippine Science High School

Republic of Korea

- Korean Minjok Leadership Academy
- Korea Science Academy of KAIST

Russian Federation

- Moscow Chemical Lyceum
- Lyceum "Physical-Technical High School"

Singapore

- National Junior College
- NUS High School of Math and Science
- School of Science and Technology, Singapore

Taiwan

- Kaohsiung Municipal Kaohsiung Girls' Senior High School

Thailand

- Chulalongkorn University Demonstration Secondary School
- Mahidol Wittayanusorn School
- Kamnoetvidya Science Academy

United Kingdom

- Camborne Science and International Academy
- Lancaster Girls' Grammar School

United States of America

- Illinois Mathematics and Science Academy
- West Aurora High School
- Lewiston-Porter High School
