= List of Tokyo Institute of Technology people =

This is a list of notable graduates and faculty members of the Tokyo Institute of Technology in Japan.

== Politics ==
- Naoto Kan – alumni, 94th Prime Minister of Japan (2010-2011)
- Yukio Hatoyama – former assistant professor, 93rd Prime Minister of Japan (2009–2010)
- Tadamichi Yamamoto - alumni, UN Special Representative of the Secretary-General for Afghanistan

== Sciences ==
- Yoshinori Ohsumi – professor, Nobel laureate (Medicine, 2016)
- Hideki Shirakawa (BSc 1961, PhD 1966) – alumni, Nobel laureate (Chemistry, 2000)
- Pailin Chuchottaworn – alumni, former CEO and president of PTT, founder and chairman of Kamnoetvidya Science Academy
- Toshikazu Sunada – alumni, mathematician who contributed to various fields in geometry, including spectral geometry, Reinhardt domain, Ihara zeta function, and periodic graph)
- Sada Orihara - alumni, the first woman to attend
- Michiko Togo - alumni, woman engineer

== Engineering ==
- Toshitada Doi – alumni, robot Aibo pioneer, co-inventor of compact disc
- Nobutaro Hara – alumni, model railway builder whose collection is displayed at the Hara Model Railway Museum
- Shōji Hayashi – alumni, architect, chairman of Japan Institute of Architects
- Shigeo Hirose – alumni, pioneer of robotics technology
- Junichi Iijima – alumni, Professor of the Department of Industrial Management and Engineering
- Satoru Iwata – alumni, former game developer at HAL Laboratories; former CEO of Nintendo
- Heitaro Nakajima – alumni, digital audio pioneer
- Julia Nesheiwat - alumni, 10th Homeland Security Advisor to the United States
- Hiroshi Takahashi – alumni, architect
- Jiro Tanaka – alumni, aircraft and automotive engineer

== Architecture ==
- Kazuo Shinohara - alumni, former professor

== Business ==
- Shoji Hamada – alumni, potter, Living National Treasure of Japan
- Kanjiro Kawai – alumni, potter, refused Living National Treasure designation
- Akitoshi Kawazu – alumni, game producer, creator of Final Fantasy Crystal Chronicles
- Kenichi Ohmae – alumni, business and corporate strategist
- Takaaki Yoshimoto – alumni, poet, literary critic, philosopher
