= Mahidol Wittayanusorn School =

- โรงเรียนมหิดลวิทยานุสรณ์

Location
- Salaya, Phutthamonthon; Nakhon Pathom, 73170; Thailand
- 13°48′2″N 100°19′8″E

Information
- School type: Public (as an autonomous public organisation), boarding science school
- Motto: Paññāya parisujjhati (Wisdom makes man pure.)
- Established: 1990
- Oversight: Minister of Education
- Principal: Pasit Lorterapong
- Grades: 10–12 (Mathayom 4–6)
- Gender: Coeducation
- Age range: 15-18
- Enrollment: 720
- Campus: Salaya
- Campus size: 4 ha
- Campus type: Suburban
- Colours: Blue and yellow
- O-NET average: 389.51/500 or 77.90% (2018 academic year)
- School fees: Full scholarship awarded to all students
- Website: mwit.ac.th
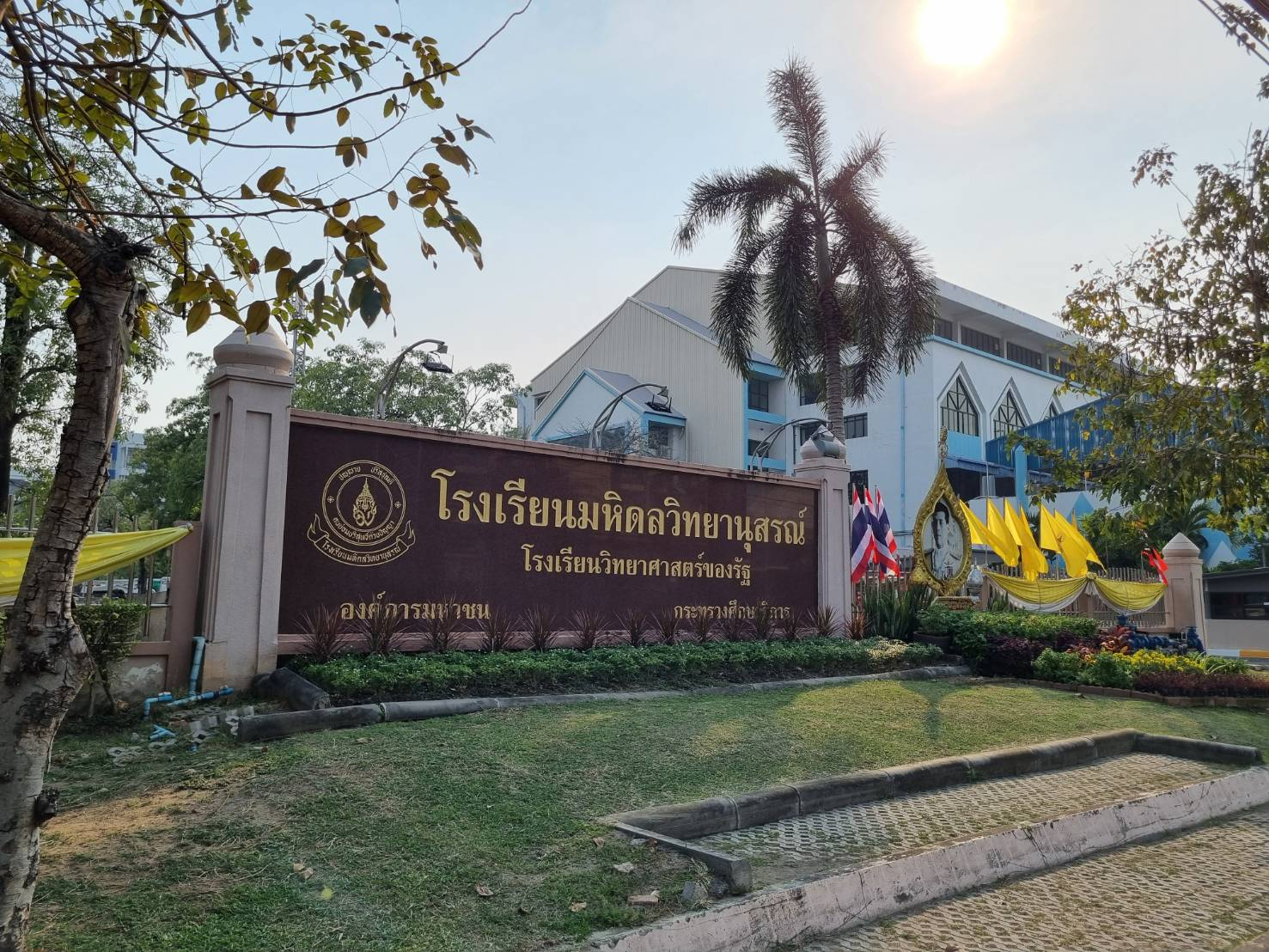

Mahidol Wittayanusorn School (Thai: โรงเรียนมหิดลวิทยานุสรณ์; RTGS: Mahidon Witthayanuson), also known colloquially as MWIT, is a secondary school in Thailand. Situated on the Salaya Campus of Mahidol University in Nakhon Pathom Province, it enrolls Mathayom 4–6 (grades 10–12) students and is the first specialised science school in the country, designed to provide education for the development of gifted and talented students in science and mathematics. The school is unique among Thai schools in that it functions as an autonomous public organisation, and receives direct funding from the government of up to 100,000 baht per student, which means that all students are awarded a full scholarship for three years, including accommodation.

== History ==
Mahidol Wittayanusorn School was founded with the purpose of promoting science and mathematics education in the Thai school system, due to concerns regarding Thailand's lack of human resources specialised in science and technology. The school was established on 28 August 1990 with cooperation between Mahidol University, which was already recognised for its science studies and would provide academic support, and the Department of General Education of the Ministry of Education, which would be the school's governing authority.

The school opened on 3 June 1991. Initially, classes were temporarily held at Wat Rai Khing in Sam Phran District until the school finally settled at its current location on the Salaya Campus of Mahidol University in 1995. This initial arrangement, however, had many limitations, mostly due to the teaching system, which still depended on the national curriculum, and inflexibility due to organisation structure as a governmental agency, and the school saw relatively little growth during the first ten years.

In 1999, government policy pushed for the development of science-specific schools to accommodate students talented in science and mathematics. Mahidol Wittayanusorn School was accordingly remodeled as an autonomous public organisation under the supervision of the minister of education on 25 August 2000, and was designated the country's first specialised science school. The first principal of the school in this form was Dr. Thongchai Chewprecha, who was the director of the Institute for the Promotion of Teaching Science and Technology. The school then developed its own curriculum and teaching systems, and began admitting students under this new regime in the 2001 academic year. The number of students competing for admission increased from 8,501 in 2001 to 17,539 in 2006.

In the 2018 academic year, Mahidol Wittayanusorn School had the highest average score on the Ordinary National Education Test (O-NET) examination, calculated using an average of scores over 5 subjects.

== Honors ==
Mahidol Wittayanusorn School, along with other well-known international science schools, has initiated an International Student Science Fair (called Thailand International Science Fair at the time of establishment) to provide venues for discussion and collaboration among students, as well as opportunities for students to present science projects they have conducted under close mentorship of faculty members from the schools and universities. In 2011, Mahidol Wittayanusorn School hosted the 7th International Student Science Fair. Among more than 30 schools that have participated in the event, those that have hosted the event are Ritsumeikan High School, Korea Science Academy, City Montessori School, National Junior College, and Australian Science and Mathematics School. Moreover, Mahidol Wittayanusorn School also provides bilateral student exchanges for its students and students from many countries across the globe including Singapore, Germany, Israel, and South Korea.

Students from Mahidol Wittayanusorn School also received awards from national and international competitions, such as the World Scholar's Cup, and various International Science Olympiads. The school also prepares students for their further education at world-class leading universities. In the past, alumni from the schools have succeeded in enrolling at top-ranked universities, including Stanford University, Massachusetts Institute of Technology, Columbia University, and Brown University. The school also has a bilateral agreement with KAIST, a top-ranked science and technology university in South Korea, where the school sends a handful of students to every year.
