= ISSF =

ISSF may refer to:

- Islamic Solidarity Sports Federation
- International Seafood Sustainability Foundation
- International Shooting Sport Federation
- International Student Science Fair
