= Hansung Science High School =

South Korean high school

Coordinates: 37°34′32″N 126°57′09″E

Hansung Science High School 한성과학고등학교

Location
- 279-79 Tongil-ro, Seodaemun-gu; Seoul; South Korea

Information
- School type: Public Gifted
- Motto: Creativity
- Established: 1992
- Principal: Han Bong-hee
- Faculty: 68
- Gender: Co-ed
- Age: 15 to 18
- Enrollment: 365
- Color
- Website: http://www.hansung-sh.hs.kr

- Hansung Science High School
- Hangul: 한성과학고등학교
- Hanja: 漢城科學高等學校
- RR: Hanseong gwahak godeunghakgyo
- MR: Hansŏng kwahak kodŭnghakkyo

Hansung Science High School (Korean: 한성과학고등학교, or simply 한성과학고 or 한성과고) is a high school (ages 15–18) in Seoul, South Korea. It was opened in 1992 and selects its students from the top 3% of middle school graduates. As of 2013, it holds 356 students (253 boys and 103 girls) with 56 teachers. It is located near Dongnimmun station which is served by Seoul Subway Line 3 (Orange Line). The school is for gifted students with talents in mathematics and sciences.

The graduates of the school usually go to engineering schools in Seoul National University, KAIST, Postech, Korea University, and other prestigious universities in Korea and the world.

== School history ==
A plan for the school was established in February 1991, with the school name being confirmed in June 1991. In March 1992, the school was designated as a special purpose high school for gifted students. The first entrance ceremony was held two days later for 180 students. The first graduation ceremony was held in February 1994, with 19 students graduating.

In September 1996, the school built its first dormitory building. In October 2004, Taeha Hall, the main library, finished construction. In February 2016, the school completed its first girls' dormitory named Seohyun Hall.

== Recruitment process ==
The recruitment and application process is divided into two stages. In the first stage, students submit documents and are interviewed regarding their attendance. The applicant's mathematical and scientific abilities are evaluated based on self-introductions and teacher recommendations. The second stage consists of a wider assembly interview, where applicants are comprehensively evaluated on their understanding of the curriculum, their potential, their creativity, and personality.

There were 140 students recruited for the 2024 school year at Hansung Science High School.

== See also ==
- Gyeonggi Science High School
- Seoul Science High School
- Sejong Science High School
