= Iwadare =

Iwadare (written: 岩垂) is a Japanese surname. Notable people with the surname include:

- Kunihiko Iwadare (岩垂 邦彦, 1857–1941), Japanese businessman
- Noriyuki Iwadare (岩垂 徳行, born 1964), Japanese video game composer
