= Sejong High School =

- Sejong High School (Miryang), South Gyeongsang Province
- Sejong High School (Sejong)
- Sejong High School (Yeoju), Gyeonggi Province
- Seoul Sejong High School
- Sejong Science High School, Seoul
