= ASMS =

ASMS may stand for:

- American Society for Mass Spectrometry, a professional society, as well as the society's annual meeting
- Arkansas School for Mathematics, Sciences, and the Arts
- Association of Salaried Medical Specialists, a New Zealand trade union.
- Australian Science and Mathematics School on the campus of Flinders University.
- Annie Sullivan Middle School Franklin, Massachusetts
- Alabama School of Mathematics and Science
- Advanced Surface Missile System – US naval combat system, predecessor of Aegis.
- Alternative School for Math and Science in Corning, NY
