= Seoul Science High School =

Seoul Science High School for Gifted Students

Location
- Hyewha-Ro; Jongno-gu, Seoul; South Korea

Information
- Type: Boarding School
- Motto: Korean: 예지의행; Hanja: 叡智義行 (Intelligence and righteous action)
- Established: 1989
- Gender: Coeducational
- Campus type: Urban

Korean name
- Hangul: 서울과학고등학교
- Hanja: 서울科學高等學校
- RR: Seoul gwahak godeunghakgyo
- MR: Sŏul kwahak kodŭnghakkyo

Seoul Science High School for Gifted Students is an academy for gifted students (ages 15–18) interested in science. The school was established in 1989, and is located at Jongno-gu, Seoul. It was established as one of the 'Science High Schools' in Republic of Korea. In 2009, it has become an 'Academy for Gifted Students' selected by the Ministry of Education of Korea. Now, it is one of the eight such academies in Republic of Korea.

The school is famous for its rigorous selection process in the search for the most gifted students among the top middle school graduate applicants from all over the nation. Before the transition, there were about 180 students in each grade. The general program was a three-year course, but an early graduation program existed. About one-third of sophomore students graduated one year earlier than the typical high school students in Korea. After the transition to an 'Academy for Gifted Students', the number of the students admitted each year was reduced to approximately 125, and the curriculum was modified to fulfill the need and curiosity of students better. The new curriculum includes the following:

- Non-graded, credit-based graduation system
- Strengthening research activities to develop creativity
- Interdisciplinary curriculum

== Purpose of establishment ==
The school was switched from a 'Science High School' to an 'Academy for Gifted Students' according to the procedures set out in Enforcement Decree of the Gifted Education Promotion Law Act Article 19. As stated in the article 12 of the same law, a person who meets the following conditions is defined as a gifted

1. Those who are recognized as having a certain level of talent or potential above a specific subject or in a specific field, according to the method of standardized intelligence test, thinking ability test, creative problem-solving ability test, or any other method of inspection, interview or observation.
2. Those who are recognized to have a certain level of talent or potential in the artistic and physical fields according to methods such as inspection, interview, or observation other than practical examination.

In accordance with Article 1 of the Gifted Education Promotion Law, the purpose of SSHS is to make early identification of talented people and early education of their talents and abilities which will develop the natural potential of the individual, promote self-realization of the individual, and contribute to the development of the nation and society.

== Focusing on advanced courses ==
- Geared to the level and aptitude of each individual
- Various programs for whole-person education
- No obligation to complete the curriculum of general high schools
- Differentiated selection process

Student recruitment is done nationwide, and multiple applications to other special high schools are allowed. Unlike general high schools, students study the‘required courses’in their 1st grade, and have an opportunity to choose‘advanced courses’in their 2nd and 3rd grades.

In order to achieve graduation, a student must fulfill 170 credits in overall course work, which consists of 140 credits in academic courses and 30 credits in research. Also, the student must fulfill at least 240 hours on special activities: 120 hours on group activity, and 120 hours of volunteer work. The university-level courses are accepted as Advanced Placement credit at KAIST, POSTECH, UNIST, GIST, and DGIST.

The school is famous for many national and international Science Olympiad participants and medal winners. Usually, a quarter to a half of the Korean participants in the International Science Olympiads are from Seoul Science High School for Gifted Students.

Graduates from this school typically enter Seoul National University, KAIST, and POSTECH. Some students enroll to colleges abroad such as MIT, Caltech, UC Berkeley, Stanford, Harvard, and Cornell. Many alumni have undertaken graduate studies at top institutions in Korea, U.S., and Europe after earning their bachelor's degrees.

The school motto is "Intelligence and Righteous Action" (예지의행, 叡智義行).

Most of the students at Seoul Science High School are male.

== Curriculum ==
=== Grades ===
All classes and assessments at the school are operated on a credit system and students can choose the course you want, like universities and other gifted schools. However, all subjects are absolute assessments. That is, if the score is 90 or more, A+ is given. If the score is 85 or more, and less than 90, A0 is given. If the score is 80 or more, and less than 85, A− is given. Since then, grades have been divided into 5 points. In addition, all the arts and physical education semesters are pass/fail system, and receive a pass if the score exceeds 60 out of 100 points.

If the grade of any subject is less than B0 or Fail, you can apply for re-entry. Students can apply for a maximum of four times per student per class and up to B+ per class if they retake classes.

=== Enrollment ===
All courses fall into three categories:

1. Required courses with scheduled classes,
2. Required courses to choose when classes are taken, and
3. Elective courses.

Applications are accepted every June and November. Unlike college, this school receives a course enrollment and then schedules a timetable according to the number of students. A minimum of 10 credits and a maximum of 29 credits are allowed per semester. If the number of applicants for any subject is less than seven, the subject is discarded. Also one class enter up to 20 people. There is also a hierarchy between subjects. For example, to apply for Advanced Chemistry I, a student must have already completed Chemistry I, II, and III.

Since students do not enroll in the first grade, the credit is fixed (first semester 30 credits, second semester 29 credits). In the second year, there will be individual differences but generally most of students get 25–29 credits per semester. In the third grade, the individual differences become more pronounced. Usually, about 40 credits are allocated to the first and second semesters. There are about 6–15 hours between classes. However, the level of difficulty of the subject greatly increases and also they live in the burden of entrance examination.

== International olympiads ==
Students of Seoul Science High School regularly make up a large part of the South Korean national teams at the International Science Olympiads, particularly in mathematics and physics.

=== Mathematics ===
Since 2010, Seoul Science High School students have filled at least five of the six places on the South Korean team at the International Mathematical Olympiad (IMO) every year. The entire team came from the school in 2011, 2014, 2015 and every year from 2017 to 2024. South Korea has finished first in the team ranking twice since 2010. In 2012, five of the six team members were from the school. In 2017, all six were, and every member of the team won a gold medal.

In 1995, Sug Woo Shin, then a second-year student at the school, became the first South Korean to achieve a perfect score at the IMO. At the 2026 IMO, a third-year student from the school achieved a perfect score and ranked first individually.

=== Physics ===
At the International Physics Olympiad (IPhO), all five members of the South Korean team were Seoul Science High School students in 2019, 2022 and 2026. Students from the school placed first overall among all participants in 2015, 2021, 2025 and 2026. At the 2026 Asian Physics Olympiad, held in Busan, all eight students on the South Korean squad selected through the IPhO training program were from the school, and all eight won gold medals.

=== Other olympiads ===
Students from the school ranked first individually at the International Biology Olympiad in 2014 and 2015. At the International Olympiad in Informatics, students from the school ranked second overall in 2006 and 2025.

== Notable alumni ==
- Lee Jun-seok

== See also ==
- Gyeonggi Science High School
- Daejeon Science High School
- Daegu Science High School
- Gwangju Science High School
- Korea Science Academy of KAIST
- Hansung Science High School
- Sejong Science High School
