= Gwangju Science High School =

School in Gwangju, South Korea

Coordinates: 35.2283°N 126.8485°E

- Hangul: 광주과학고등학교
- Hanja: 光州科學高等學校
- RR: Gwangju gwahak godeunghakgyo
- MR: Kwangju kwahak kodŭnghakkyo

Gwangju Science Academy for the Gifted is one of the science schools in South Korea, located in Gwangju. It was opened in March 1984 as Jeonnam Science High School (전남과학고등학교) which was changed to the current name in 1990. Gwangju Science High School is known as a science specialized magnet school for students who want to major in science, mathematics and engineering in university.

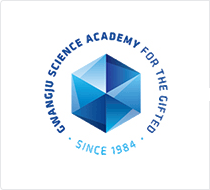
:Logo of Gwangju Science Academy

Korea's first astronaut, Yi So-Yeon, is an alumnus of this school.

== See also ==
- Gyeonggi Science High School
- Seoul Science High School
- Yi So-Yeon
