= St Michael's Secondary School =

Location
- Trevu Road; Camborne, Cornwall, TR14 7AD; England; 50°12′32″N 5°17′53″W

Information
- Type: Free school
- Established: 2012
- Closed: 2017
- Local authority: Cornwall
- Department for Education URN: 138780 Tables
- Ofsted: Reports
- Headteacher: I H Kenworthy
- Gender: Mixed
- Age: 11 to 16
- Enrolment: 147

St Michael's Secondary School was a mixed free school located in Camborne, Cornwall, England. It opened in 2012, had a Roman Catholic ethos and catered for students aged 11–16 years. Due to a lack of pupil numbers it was merged with Camborne Science and International Academy and closed in 2017.

== History ==
The school opened in 2012 as part of the first wave of free schools, but struggled to attract large numbers of students which would make it viable. It was located on the former Camborne Grammar School site.

In May 2015 the school's new sponsors – Camborne Science and International Academy – announced that it was not viable and would close.

== Ofsted ==
In April 2014, the school had its first Ofsted inspection, which showed that it "Requires improvement". The inspectors noted that the quality of teaching, specifically teachers’ use of assessment, was too uneven to promote consistently good progress for all students.
