= Yeo Jun Wei =

Former Singaporean spy for People's Republic of China

Dickson Yeo Jun Wei
- Born: 22 February 1981 (age 45); Singapore
- Other name: Dickson Yeo
- Education: National Junior College (1998–1999); Oklahoma City University (2004–2006)
- Alma mater: National University of Singapore (2009–2011)
- Agent: Ministry of State Security (China)
- Known for: Spying on the United States on behalf of the People's Republic of China
- Criminal charges: Acting in the United States as an Illegal Agent of a Foreign Government, in violation of 18 U.S. Code § 951 – Agents of foreign governments; Acting as a paid agent of a foreign state in Singapore
- Criminal penalty: Sentenced to 14 months' imprisonment on 9 October 2020 in the United States; backdated to November 2019.; 2 years detention under ISA in Singapore
- Criminal status: Pleaded guilty as charged on 24 July 2020. Released on 30 December 2020 by the American authorities.; Detained by ISD since 29 January 2021 for 2 years in Singapore. Currently out of prison since 14 December 2021 on an order of conditional release.

Yao Junwei
- Simplified Chinese: 姚俊威
- Hanyu Pinyin: Yáo Jùnwēi

Dickson Yeo Jun Wei (Chinese: 姚俊威; pinyin: Yáo Jùnwēi; born 22 February 1981), also known as Dickson Yeo, is a Singaporean convicted of espionage by the United States on behalf of the People's Republic of China (PRC, China). On 24 July 2020, he pleaded guilty at the United States District Court for the District of Columbia of assisting China in collecting information in the United States without prior notification made to the United States Attorney General under the Foreign Agents Registration Act.

After being released by the United States on 30 December 2020 and upon his return to Singapore, Yeo was subsequently additionally arrested and then further detained by Singapore's Internal Security Department (ISD) on 29 January 2021 for his spying activities, before he was conditionally released later that year on 14 December 2021 after they ascertained he no longer posed a threat to the intelligence of Singapore.

== Early life and education ==
Yeo was born and raised in Singapore. He studied at National Junior College between 1998 and 1999. Thereafter, he studied mass communications at the Oklahoma City University between 2004 and 2006. He went on to the National University of Singapore (NUS) to study for a master's degree in South East Asian studies between 2009 and 2011. He later started studying for a Doctor of Philosophy in Public Policy degree in 2015 at the NUS Lee Kuan Yew School of Public Policy (LKYSPP). In 2019, he was granted a leave of absence from the programme.

== As a People's Republic of China agent ==
=== Being recruited ===
While still receiving education at LKYSPP, Yeo made a presentation on Southeast Asia's political situation at Beijing in 2015 and was approached by individuals who claimed to be China-based think tanks. They offered him money in exchange for political reports. Yeo later learnt that at least four of these individuals were Chinese intelligence officers. One of the intelligence officers later offered Yeo a contract to work with the People's Liberation Army. Yeo refused to sign the contract, but he continued to assist and work for the intelligence service.

Between 2015 and 2019, Yeo had made frequent trips to China, meeting different operatives for at least 40 times. (Note: As noted in Yeo's statement, he had met with an operative between 19 and 25 times, and another approximately 25 times.) In each trip, he would be processed in a separate office, away from the custom lines upon arrival to conceal his identity. Yeo would also maintain communications with the officers via WeChat, through by changing different WeChat accounts and phones each time they communicated. However, when Yeo was in United States, he was instructed not to communicate with the intelligence officers over concerns that their communications would be intercepted. If need be, he would email them from a local coffee shop. Yeo was also issued with a bank card to facilitate payments to his targets.

=== Information gathering efforts ===
Yeo was tasked by the intelligence officers to provide them with information about international political, economic and diplomatic relations, and these pieces of information were to be of "non-public" in origin, and were referred to as "scuttlebutt". In one of his meetings with the intelligence officers in China, he was specified to obtain non-public information about the U.S. Department of Commerce, artificial intelligence, and the Trump administration's trade war with China.

Yeo's focus was initially Southeast Asian centric, but subsequently was switched to United States. By combing through LinkedIn, Yeo found Americans, including U.S. military and government employees with high-level security clearances, with resumes and job descriptions suggesting that they would have access to valuable non-public information which the Chinese intelligence officers seek. After he identified individuals worth targeting, Yeo followed guidance he received from Chinese intelligence operatives regarding target recruitment methods, including identifying their vulnerabilities, such as dissatisfaction with work or financial difficulties. Yeo then solicited them for non-public information and paid them to write reports. Yeo told these American targets that the reports were for clients in Asia, without revealing that they were in fact destined for the Chinese government.

In 2018, Yeo created a fake consulting company that used the same name as a prominent U.S. consulting firm that conducted public and government relations, and Yeo posted job advertisements under that company name. He would receive more than 400 resumes, with 90 percent of them coming from U.S. military and government personnel with security clearances, and he passed resumes of interest to one of the Chinese intelligence operatives.

Between January 2019 and July 2019, Yeo stayed in Washington, D.C. where he attended several events and speaking engagements at D.C. area think tanks. Yeo also contacted several individuals from lobbying firms and defence contracting companies.

==== Successful recruitment of individuals ====
Yeo managed to successfully recruit multiple United States citizens to provide him with information.

In 2015, through LinkedIn, Yeo spotted and contacted a civilian who was working with United States Air Force on the F-35B military aircraft programme. The civilian held high-level security clearance, and was having financial trouble. Yeo had him write a report. The civilian also provided additional information about the geopolitical implications of the Japanese purchasing F-35 aircraft from the US which Yeo used to draft a report for his Chinese contacts.

In response to the job posting that Yeo had posted for his fake consulting company, a United States Army officer had sent in his resume. The officer was assigned to the Pentagon which was US Army's headquarters at that time. Yeo contacted the officer via a social networking app, and had met him on multiple occasions. The officer confided in Yeo that he was traumatised by his military tours in Afghanistan. Yeo asked him to write reports for clients in Korea and other Asian countries, and withheld the fact that it would be read by a foreign government. The officer wrote a report on how the withdrawal of U.S. military forces from Afghanistan would impact China, which Yeo paid $2,000. The money was made to the officer's wife's account.

Between 2018 and 2019, Yeo spotted another individual on LinkedIn who was employed at the US Department of State at the time. This individual felt dissatisfied at work and was having financial trouble, worrying about his upcoming retirement. Despite his misgivings about jeopardising his retirement pension if it was made known that he had provided Yeo a report, he wrote a report about a then-serving member of the Cabinet of the United States, and was paid $1,000 or $2,000.

=== Arrest ===
Sometime after the Army officer had provided his report, one of the Chinese intelligence officers instructed Yeo to recruit him to provide classified information. Yeo was also promised more money if the Army officer could become a permanent conduit of information. Yeo returned to United States in November 2019 with plans to ask the Army officer to provide classified information, and reveal who he was actually working for. However upon arrival at the airport, Yeo was stopped by law enforcement, questioned, and eventually arrested. No further contact with the Army officer could be made by Yeo.

=== Conviction and sentencing ===
Yeo's indictment was unsealed on 18 June 2020, with a guilty plea from Yeo entered on 24 July 2020 in the United States District Court for the District of Columbia. In his plea, he admitted to the charge of "one count of acting within the United States as an illegal agent of a foreign power without first notifying the Attorney General", in violation of 18 U.S.C. § 951. Yeo was sentenced to 14 months' imprisonment on 9 October 2020 (the sentence was two months short of the original sentence the prosecutors sought in their closing submissions on sentence). The sentence was backdated to November 2019, 11 months earlier since his confinement pending his conviction by the court in view of the prevalence of the COVID-19 pandemic in the United States (this was the same reason the judge cited for giving Yeo a lighter sentence for his crime), meaning that Yeo would have to serve three more months in prison and would be released in January 2021.

=== Release and detention in Singapore ===
Dickson Yeo was released and returned to Singapore on 30 December 2020. Upon his return, he was arrested in Singapore by the Internal Security Department for investigations to investigate if he had engaged in "activities prejudicial to Singapore’s security".

Yeo was given a two-year long order of detention under the Internal Security Act on 29 January 2021, after investigations showed that in addition to Yeo's spying activities against the United States, he had tried further his information gathering activities on Singapore government as well by attempting to secure employment in a range of government jobs. Yeo had also carried out similar activities in Singapore, as he did in the United States, approaching several people with relevant knowledge and expertise via social media in order to obtain information to write reports about Singapore for his handlers in China. The duration of the detention would be used to further investigate the full extent of Yeo's activities.

=== Release ===
On 14 December 2021, Dickson Yeo was released from detention under a suspension order, after the authorities ascertained that he no longer posed as a danger to Singapore's security and intelligence. The order of release also stated some unstated conditions that Yeo should comply with while he is out of prison, and he will be re-detained should he fail to comply with them.

In January 2023, Yeo was granted a restriction order, which barred him from any form of travel out of Singapore or change addresses or jobs, without approval. In the absence of approval, Yeo was also not allowed to access the Internet or social media and make public statements etc.

In January 2025, the restriction order was allowed to lapse, after the Internal Security Department (ISD) found that Yeo's threat as a foreign agent was neutralized.

== International reactions ==
=== United States ===
In the press release of Yeo's guilty plea, Alan E. Kohler, Jr., the assistant director of the FBI Counterintelligence Division, was quoted: "Mr. Yeo admits he set up a fake consulting company to further his scheme, looked for susceptible individuals who were vulnerable to recruitment, and tried to avoid detection by U.S. authorities. But this isn't just about this particular defendant. This case is yet another reminder that China is relentless in its pursuit of U.S. technology and policy information in order to advance its own interests. The FBI and our partners will be just as aggressive in uncovering these hidden efforts and charging individuals who break our laws."

=== People's Republic of China ===
Foreign Ministry spokesman Wang Wenbin told the media on 27 July 2020 that he was unaware of Yeo's espionage cases. Wang criticised the United States and also berated the US to stop the "smear" campaign against China, saying: "I’m not aware of what you just mentioned, but I would like to point out that lately, US law enforcement has been busy hyping up the so-called China infiltration and espionage issues to the point of paranoia."

=== Singapore ===
==== Singapore government officials ====
Responding to media queries, Singapore's Ministry of Home Affairs (MHA) issued a statement on 26 July 2020 that it was informed by US authorities of Yeo's arrest in November 2019. Its investigations did not reveal any direct threat to Singapore's security. The MHA reminded Singaporeans of the expectations to abide by the laws of the country which they visit or reside in. Appropriate consular assistance was rendered to Yeo as required, a fact which the foreign affairs minister of Singapore, Vivian Balakrishnan, confirmed.

==== Lee Kuan Yew School of Public Policy ====
The institution announced the termination of Yeo's PhD candidature on 26 July 2020, and removed Yeo's profile from the institution official website, after the information of Yeo's criminal act were released by the United States Department of Justice.

=== Bilahari Kausikan ===
The retired Singapore diplomat Bilahari Kausikan criticised Yeo on his Facebook page on 25 July 2020. Kausikan characterised Yeo as being foolish and said his actions could cause all Singaporeans to be suspected, and stated that it is not unreasonable to assume Yeo was recruited to work as a spy when he was a student at the LKYSPP. Kausikan added that he later learnt that Huang Jing, the political scientist and alleged spy, was Yeo's supervisor in LKYSPP.

In an interview with Mothership, a Singaporean news website, Kausikan referred to Yeo as a "traitor", and said: "the probability is that Yeo was 'at least talent-spotted' by Huang or Huang 'played some sort of a role'", and that he did not believe that it was simply a pure coincidence.

=== Huang Jing ===
Huang Jing stated that he was "shocked" when he learnt the news of Yeo's incident from another former student; he also felt glad that Yeo was caught. Huang told the media that he seldom interacted with Yeo and only knew him as "Dickson Yeo". Huang also said that Yeo's academic performance was the worst among the six PhD students under Huang's supervision. In response to Kausikan's allegations, Huang denied he recruited Yeo to conduct the espionage and told the media that Kausikan's claims were "nonsense" and "unreasonable", as well as demanding Kausikan to either prove the comments or retract them.
