= Tevin Vongvanich =

Thai businessman

- Born: 31 August 1958 (age 68); Bangkok, Thailand
- Education: Chulalongkorn University; Rice University; University of Houston
- Occupation: businessman
- Title: CEO, PTT Public Company Limited
- Term: 2015 - August 2018
- Predecessor: Pailin Chuchottaworn
- Successor: Chansin Treenuchagron

Tevin Vongvanich (born 31 August 1958) is a Thai businessman, and the CEO of PTT Public Company Limited, a Thai state-owned oil and gas company, and a Fortune Global 500 company, since September 2015, when he succeeded Pailin Chuchottaworn.

He has a bachelor's degree in chemical engineering from Chulalongkorn University, a master's degree in chemical engineering from Rice University, and a master's degree in petroleum engineering from the University of Houston.
