= Huang Jing (academic) =

Chinese-American political scientist

- Born: 1956 (age 69–70); People's Republic of China
- Education: Master degree, Fudan University; PhD, Harvard University
- Alma mater: Sichuan University; Fudan University; Harvard University
- Occupation: Political scientist
- Known for: Attempt to affect Singapore's diplomatic policy and alleged spy.
- Spouse: Shirley Yang Xiuping

Chinese name
- Traditional Chinese: 黃靖
- Simplified Chinese: 黄靖
- Hanyu Pinyin: Huáng Jìng

Huang Jing (Chinese: 黄靖; born 1956) is a Chinese-American political scientist and alleged foreign agent. He was the director of the Centre on Asia and Globalisation and the Lee Foundation Professor on US-China Relations at the National University of Singapore's Lee Kuan Yew School of Public Policy until his permanent residence was revoked after the Singaporean Ministry of Home Affairs called him "an agent of influence of a foreign country" on August 4, 2017.

== Biography ==
=== Early life ===
Huang Jing was born in China in 1956. His parents were military doctors who served in the People's Volunteer Army during the Korean War. While a teenager, he was sent to Yunnan as part of the Down to the Countryside Movement.

Huang graduated from Sichuan University, where he earned a bachelor of arts degree in English, and he went on to earn a master's degree in history from Fudan University and a PhD from Harvard University in 1995.

Huang is married to Shirley Yang Xiuping (楊秀萍). They are both U.S. citizens, and resided in Singapore. In 2017, both of them had their Singapore permanent residence permit cancelled by the Ministry of Foreign Affairs and denied re-entry to Singapore.

=== Career ===
Huang taught at Harvard University from 1993 to 1994. He was an associate professor of political science at Utah State University from 1994 to 2004, where he was also the director of the Asia Studies Program, and he was granted tenure in 1998. He also taught at Shandong University. He was a Shorenstein Fellow at Stanford University from 2002 to 2003, and a Senior Fellow at the Brookings Institution's John Thornton China Center from 2004 to 2008.

In 2008, Huang joined the Lee Kuan Yew School of Public Policy at the National University of Singapore, where he was the director of the Centre on Asia and Globalization and the Lee Foundation Professor on US-China Relations. He also became an analyst for Xinhua News Agency. Since 2019, Huang has been the dean of the Institute of International and Regional Studies at the Beijing Language and Culture University.

== Intervention in Singapore diplomatic incident ==
On August 4, 2017, Huang's permanent residence in Singapore was cancelled, and both his wife and himself were permanently denied re-entry, on the assumption that he was "an agent of influence of a foreign country" and "subversion and foreign interference in Singapore's domestic politics" by the Singaporean Ministry of Home Affairs. He was accused by the Ministry of Home Affairs for working for intelligence organizations and agents from an unnamed country to influence Singapore's foreign policy and local public opinion.

After Huang's permanent residence was cancelled, he was sharply critical of the move when addressing the media: "It's nonsense to identify me as 'an agent of influence' for a foreign country. And why didn't they identify which foreign country they're referring to? Is it the US or China?". He also told the media he would seek help from his lawyer and the US Embassy in Singapore. Huang also refuted on the cancellation of his PR by stating that: "My family and my home are all here. I have property in Singapore, too. How can they treat me like this? If they have evidence, they should take me to court."

Huang also claimed that he wasn't given a deadline to leave Singapore and had seven days to appeal against the cancellation to Ministry of Home Affairs which he did so on 7 August. The appeal was eventually rejected on 23 August 2017 and he and his spouse were permanently banned from re-entering Singapore. Huang said he will seek help from lawyer and United States embassy in Singapore. According to The New York Times, "[s]ome view his academic writings as pro-Chinese."

=== NUS reaction ===
The National University of Singapore spokesman told the media that the NUS has a zero tolerance approach towards foreign interference, and will not be able to allow Huang to continue working at NUS due to his permit being cancelled.

=== Later comments ===
In June 2019, Huang told the South China Morning Post that he "worked the whole year in Washington DC, my home, to show that I am not what Singapore implied I am". At the time of Huang's remarks, Singapore did not clarify which country they believed Huang to be acting on behalf of, and Huang said he "wanted to show that at least the US doesn’t think I am working for whoever". He also added that he didn't have "any hard feelings against Singapore" for the incident.

==== Bilahari Kausikan's response ====
Bilahari Kausikan responded to Huang's comment by telling the Mothership website that Singapore is not "some banana republic" that will take serious action carelessly. Kausikan also said Huang's working in the United States proves nothing, as Huang was working against Singapore's interest instead of against the United States' interest.

=== Yeo Jun Wei agent incident ===
On 25 July 2020, a Singaporean named Dickson Yeo Jun Wei was charged with using his political consultancy in America as a front to collect information for China's intelligence agency. Yeo's PhD supervisor at National University of Singapore had been Huang Jing before he was deported by Singapore. Kausikan claims Huang Jing was the Chinese "agent" who had recruited Yeo to spy for Beijing, Huang respond to Kausikan's remark and told the media that Kausikan's claim were "nonsense" and "unreasonable", as well as demanded Kausikan either prove the comments or retract them.

== Publication ==
=== Books publication ===
Huang Jing had made several publication of books, including Factionalism in Chinese Communist Politics, which won the 2002 Masayoshi Ohira Memorial Prize.

- Jing Huang (23 November 2006), Factionalism in Chinese Communist Politics, Cambridge University Press, ISBN 978-0-521-03258-2
- Jing Huang; Xiaoting Li (2010), Inseparable Separation: The Making of China's Taiwan Policy, World Scientific, ISBN 978-981-4287-36-4
- Jing Huang (27 January 2017), Autonomy, Agency and Identity in Foreign Language Learning and Teaching, BiblioBazaar, ISBN 978-1-374-68286-3

=== Newspaper commentaries ===
Huang had written pro-Beijing commentaries for newspaper office from China, including the People's Daily. His action had been quoted by The New York Times and The Washington Post.
