= Korea Science Academy of KAIST =

High school in Busan, South Korea

Coordinates: 35°09′57″N 129°01′31″E

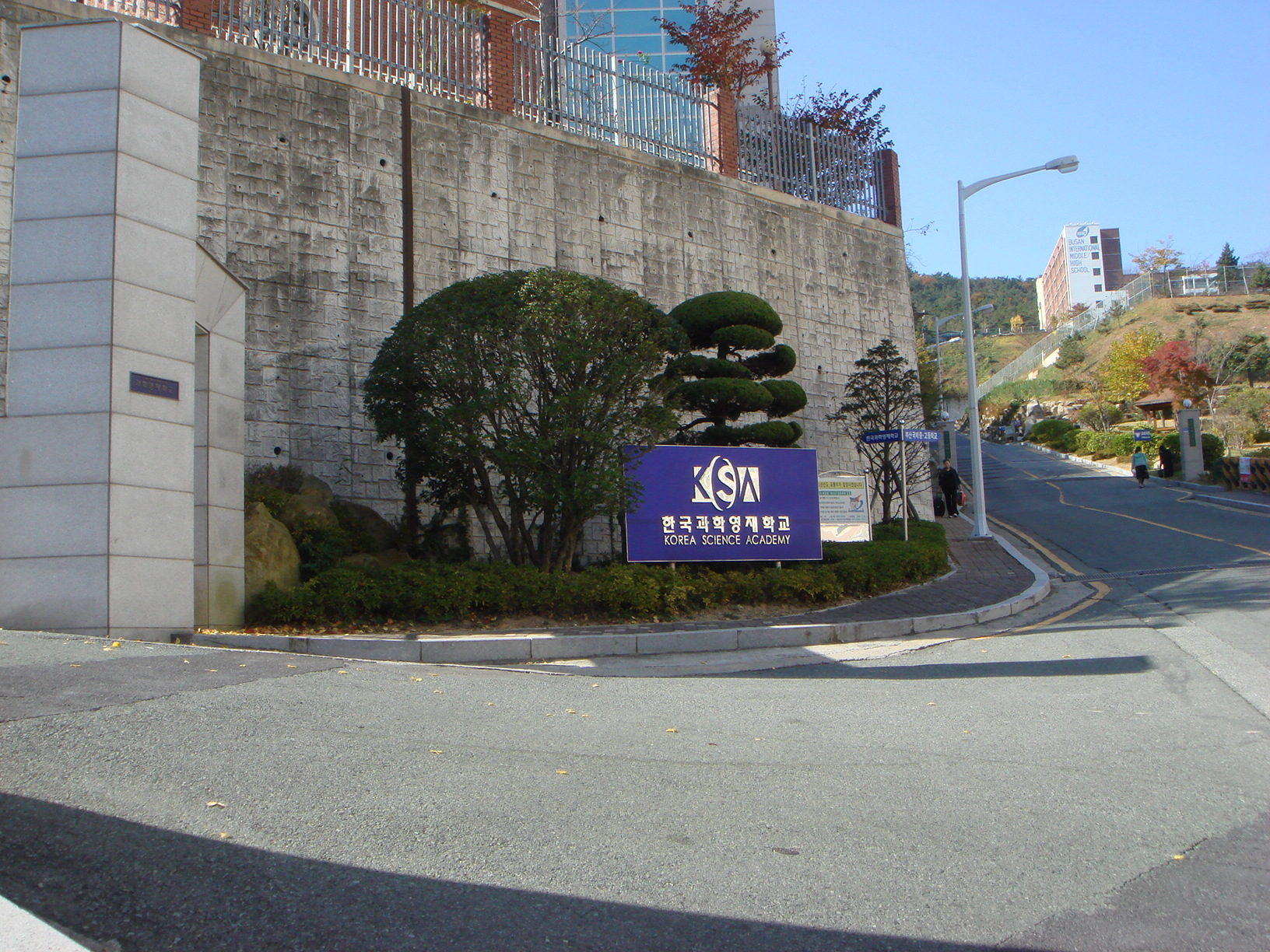
- Motto: Creativity, Passion, Service
- Type: School for the gifted
- Established: 1991 / Has converted to gifted science high school at 2003
- Principal: Jongbae Choi
- Faculty: 70
- Students: 457
- Location: Busan, South Korea
- Campus: 899, Danggam 3-dong, Busanjin-gu, Busan
- Website: ksa.hs.kr

- Korea Science Academy of KAIST
- Hangul: 한국과학기술원 부설 한국과학영재학교
- Hanja: 韓國科學技術院 附設 韓國科學英才學校
- RR: Hanguk gwahak gisurwon buseol Hanguk gwahak yeongjae hakgyo
- MR: Han'guk kwahak kisurwŏn pusŏl Han'guk kwahak yŏngjae hakkyo

Korea Science Academy of KAIST (Korean: 한국과학기술원 부설 한국과학영재학교) is a gifted science high school, which is a sort of magnet school in Korea that is located in Busan, South Korea. KSA is one of the eight gifted high school in Korea, and is only national high school among them. The enrollment of KSA is known as the most selective among Korean high schools, which is often regarded as top 3 with Seoul Science High School and Gyeonggi Science High School. More than 90% of alumni attend SNU, KAIST, Postech or college abroad. Several students has been annually accepted by Harvard, Yale, Princeton, Stanford, Caltech, Cambridge, Oxford, and others. It was founded in 1991 as Busan (Pusan) Science High School (BSHS). In 2001, BSHS was designated as a school for gifted science students by the Ministry of Science and Technology. The name was changed to the Korea Science Academy (KSA) in 2005. In 2009, the school announced formal ties with KAIST.

== History ==
On December 18, 1989, the Ministry of Education approved the establishment of the Busan Science Academy, and Chang-sik Shin was appointed as its first principal on March 1, 1991. That same day, the Ministry of Education appointed BSA as a 'for-researching' school until February 28, 1993.

It opened the school on March 4, 1991, and took its first entrance ceremony. On March 1, 1997, the Ministry of Education appointed BSA as a model school.

The school was constructed in a new place and moved there. It went from Yeonje District to Busanjin District, both of which are of Korea's Autonomous District. Later, the school also changed its name to Korea Science Academy on July 12, 2005.

Establishing a branch school of Korea Science Academy of KAIST is in progress.

== Curriculum ==
The curriculum is composed of academic courses (135 credits), Creative Research Activities (30 credits), and Leadership Activities courses (8AU).

Most of the STEM courses are designed to be college level. Especially, AP (different to American AP) courses' credits and grades are directly recognized by KAIST, Postech and others. Thus, the grading criteria is a subject to a National audit, to be same or more stricter to college. It helps alumina to graduate 1–2 years faster at college than other students.

== Exchange programs ==
Academic exchanges with overseas universities, research centers and other related institutions.

=== Partnership Schools (22 organizations in 12 countries) ===
Country	Institutes
U.S. (3)	Illinois Mathematics and Science Academy (IMSA) Northside College Preparatory High School (NCPHS) Roanoke Valley Governor's School for Science and Technology (RVGS)
Russia (5)	Kolmogorov Math and Science High School Novosibirsk Math and Physics High School St. Petersburg Math-Physics High School Moscow Chemical Lyceum Lyceum Physical Technical High School St. Petersburg
Thailand (2)	Mahidol Wittayanusorn School (MWITS) Kamnoetvidya Science Academy (KVIS)
Australia (2)	Australian Science and Mathematics School (ASMS)' John Monash Science School (JMSS)
Singapore (2)	National Junior College (NJC) National University of Singapore High School of Mathematics and Science (NUSH)
Japan (1)	Ritsumeikan Junior and Senior School
China (2)	High School Affiliated to Fudan University Hong Kong G.T. (Ellen Yeung) College
Israel (1)	Israel Arts and Science Academy
UK (1)	Camborne Science and International Academy
Malaysia (1)	Alam Shah Science School
Germany (1)	MINT-EC
Philippines (1)	Manila Science High School

== See also ==
- Gyeonggi Science High School
- Seoul Science High School
- Daegu Science High School
