= Sejong Science High School =

High school in Seoul, South Korea

Coordinates: 37°29′47″N 126°49′37″E

Sejong Science High School 세종과학고등학교
- Seoul; South Korea

Information
- Type: Public (magnet) secondary
- Established: 2008
- Principal: Young-Sam Kim (2023-)
- Faculty: 113
- Enrollment: 431
- Website: Official Website

- Sejong Science High School
- Hangul: 세종과학고등학교
- Hanja: 世宗科學高等學校
- RR: Sejong gwahak godeunghakgyo
- MR: Sejong kwahak kodŭnghakkyo

Sejong Science High School (SJSH) is a science high school (for ages 15–18) located in Guro-gu, Seoul, South Korea. It was founded in 2008 to develop and nurture the intellectual potential of Korea's most talented high school students in science and technology. Along with Hansung Science High School and Seoul Science High School, Sejong Science High School make up the three science high schools of Seoul.

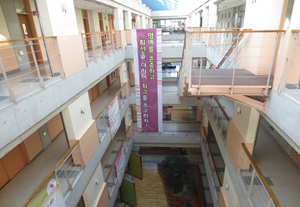
Inside of the school

== History ==
On November 3, 2005, the project about establishing new science high school in Seoul was approved by Ministry of Education and Science Technology. The name of the school, Sejong Science High School, is named after Sejong the Great, the king who created the Korean alphabet; Hangul.

== Educational Program with Local Residents as a target ==
=== Friendly Math Festival ===
Friendly Math Festival, which was held in mid-July annually since 2008, is local science/math festival managed by Sejong Science High School. Local residents, public as well as students can participate in the festival. The main purpose of this festival is to enlighten and educate "science-apathetic, technology-apathetic public" with various activities, including exhibitions, workshops, live demonstrations of experiments and user created contents. Although the name of the festival is Friendly "Math" Festival, participants can experience not only mathematical activities but science and technological events. Each booth provides entertainment in different topic such as game theory, fractal, geometry, graph theory and sequence.

=== Scientific Development Class/Inventor Class ===
Scientific Development Class/Inventor Class is an education project for all of middle school students in Seoul, including educationally disadvantaged student in local society, especially in Guro-gu. Since Guro-gu is educationally disadvantaged district compare to other part of Seoul, Sejong Science High School provide advantage to middle school students in Guro-gu when they apply to Scientific Development Class/Inventor Class.

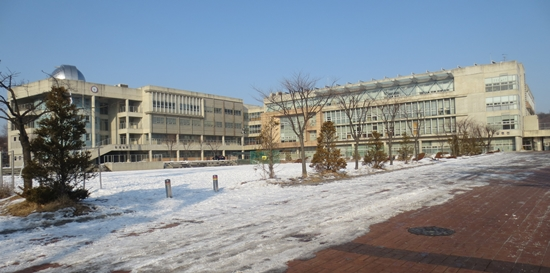
Outside of the school

== See also ==
- List of Korean Science High Schools
- Gyeonggi Science High School
- Seoul Science High School
