= Camborne Grammar School =

Grammar school in Cornwall, England

Coordinates: 50.209°N 5.293°W

Camborne Grammar School in Camborne, Cornwall, was a girls' grammar school between 1908 and 1976.

== Origins ==
In 1877 Redbrooke College for young ladies was founded at Redbrooke House on Camborne Hill. There were about 20 boarders and also day girls. There were three teachers at first and later a Miss Chudleigh came from Liskeard to be headmistress until 1896 when Miss Kay took charge. In 1897 Miss Pratt of Girton College, Cambridge took over the role.

With the 1904 Education Act, state secondary education was planned for a limited number of pupils. Redbrooke College became Redbrooke County School and the number of pupils increased so that it was necessary to transfer to a new larger building at the bottom of Camborne Hill, (Trevu Road).

== History ==
The new premises were officially opened in 1908 as Camborne Grammar School and were built to accommodate pupils from the Camborne-Redruth area, extending from Gwithian in the west to St. Agnes in the east and south to villages such as St Day and Troon. (Boys from this same area attended Redruth Grammar School).

The first headmistress of Camborne Grammar School was Miss Pratt and up until the 1930s the number of pupils increased. In 1933 Miss Evans became headmistress and during the depression years the numbers attending the school decreased. In 1935 Mr C.V.Thomas, chairman of the governors presented the school with a new gym and Camborne was the first grammar school in Cornwall to have a purpose built gym.

During the Second World War the pupils and staff of Paddington and Maida Vale school shared the premises for some time and at this time biology was the only science subject taught due to lack of staff. Even after the war there was still rationing of food and school dinners and milk were said to be welcome.

With the Education Act 1944 the kindergarten and preparatory department were closed and there were no more fee payers in the school. Also in 1944 the Eleven plus exam scheme for entry to the Grammar school was introduced. In 1947 Miss Evans retired and Miss Bain from Edinburgh University became headmistress.

In the 1950s the school premises became too small for the greater number of pupils and in 1954 a new block was built in the school grounds. Miss Bain left in 1967 when Mrs. Bannister became headmistress until 1971 when numbers had increased by 33%. Mrs Mostyn took over in 1971 when it became necessary to look elsewhere for extra classrooms. The first outpost was the nearby St. Johns Catholic School and the second outpost was the Camborne Community Centre.

In 1975 the sixth form was moved to a new centre at Treswithian School (later renamed to Camborne Science and International Academy) and, due to the introduction of the comprehensive system, at the end of the 1976 summer term the rest of the school followed to this site.

== Later history ==
The school building later became home to the Basset Junior School under headmaster Mr Treneer and, from 1980, also the site of Beacon Infants School, under headmistress Mrs Gratton-Kane. These later became merged and renamed Trevithick County Primary until 1997, in which the school moved to a new building further down the road. Following this, the school premises became the Trevu Children's Centre' for pre-school children and early learning which provided a toy library, various health services, a nursery and crèche, a cafe, and access to training and development for parents and carers.

In June 2009 Cornwall County Council put the building up for sale as a site for development. Not only does this mean that Children's services and facilities closed, but potentially the building could have been demolished to redevelop the site. Local parents have formed a campaign group to try to force the Council to reconsider their actions.

Zoe Fox, spokesperson for Cornish political party Mebyon Kernow and local campaigner, condemned the proposed closure of the Children's Centre at Trevu in Camborne. She said, “It is a scandal that Trevu Childrens’ [sic?] Centre is under threat and the building is scheduled to be sold off for soulless residential redevelopment. The facilities at Trevu are first class and incredibly well used. The proposed dispersal of these services will impact badly on many families. The Centre gives heart to our community and is the best possible use of our heritage. It gives local people the chance to enjoy a beautiful old building with services available on one site including a sensory playground, cafe, toy library, day care and after school clubs catering from nursery to teens as well as support for families. It is a community hub and a valuable resource particularly for isolated young families. Just because the site is valuable is not a reason to sell it off and disperse the services."

As part of the Government's Free School programme, the building was once again bought back into use as a school. Following refurbishment and a £3.5million extension, St Michael's Secondary School opened on the site. Following a disappointing Ofsted inspection, it was announced by the Department for Education and the school's governors that the sponsorship of St. Michael's School would transfer to the Camborne Science and International Academy whilst remaining as a separate school. It was confirmed that the Catholic ethos of the school would be continued, but that the school would no longer continue with as a designation Catholic school.

== Headmistresses ==
- Miss Pratt (1908–1933)
- Miss Evans (1933–1947)
- Miss Bain (1947–1967)
- Mrs Bannister (1967–1971)
- Mrs Mostyn (1971–1976)
