= Ochanomizu University =

Women's university in Tokyo, Japan

Coordinates: 35°43′07″N 139°43′57″E

- お茶の水女子大学
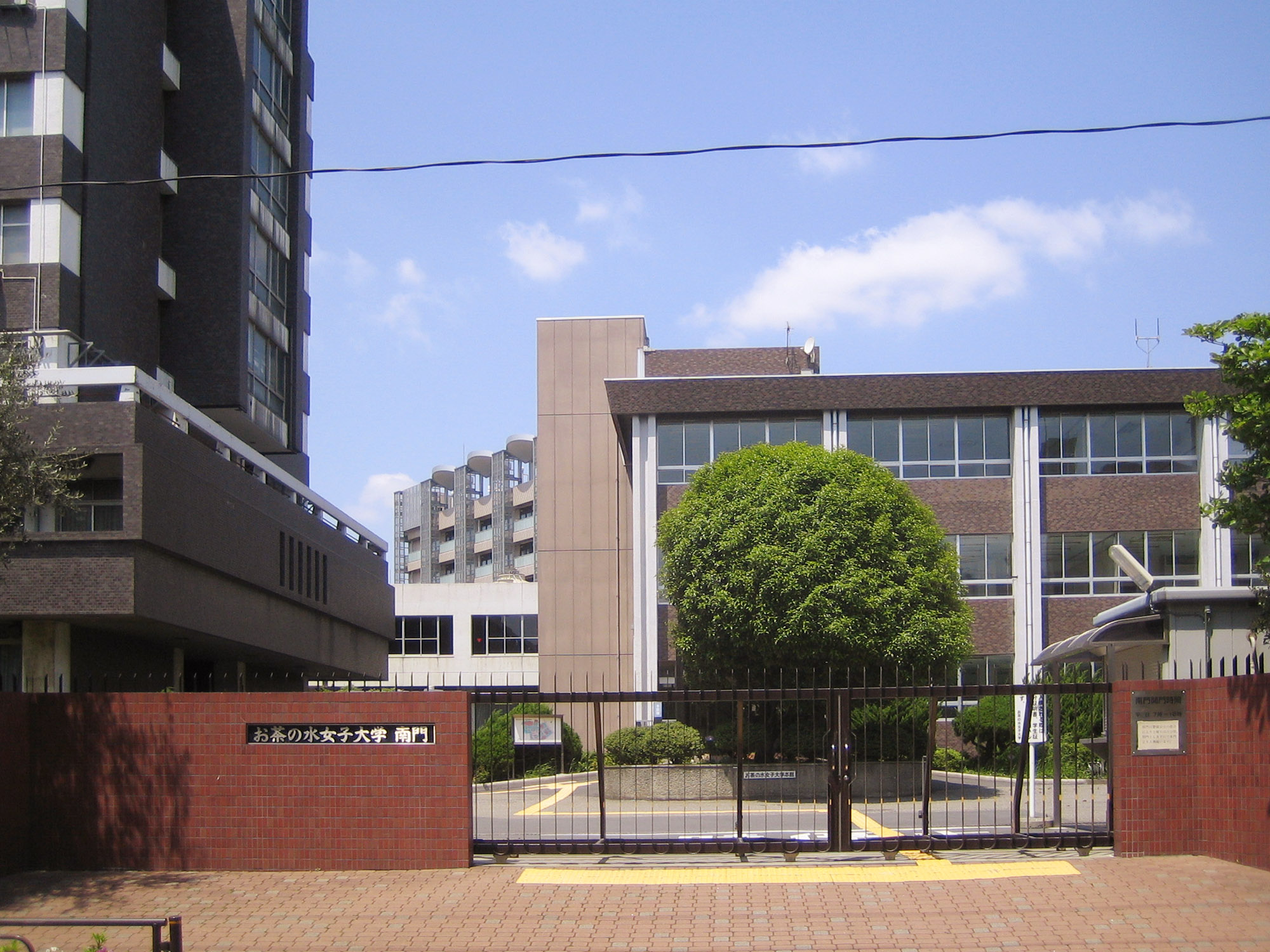
- South Gate entrance
- Type: National university
- Established: 1875
- President: Kimiko Murofushi
- Undergraduates: 2062 (as of 2012)
- Postgraduates: 933 (as of 2012)
- Location: Bunkyo, Tokyo, Japan
- Campus: Urban area
- Website: www.ocha.ac.jp

Ochanomizu University (お茶の水女子大学, Ochanomizu Joshi Daigaku) is a women's national university in the Ōtsuka neighborhood of Bunkyō-ku, Tokyo, Japan. Ochanomizu is the name of a Tokyo neighborhood where the university was founded.

== History ==
The university traces its origins to 1875, when Tokyo Women's Normal School was founded in Tokyo's Ochanomizu neighborhood (now Yushima, Bunkyo-ku). It subsequently underwent a series of name changes: "The Women's Campus of Tokyo Normal School", "The Women's Campus of Higher Normal School", "Women's Higher Normal School", and "Tokyo Women’s Higher Normal School".

The original campus was destroyed in the Great Kantō earthquake; on 31 August 1923, a new campus was established in its present location in the Ōtsuka neighborhood of Bunkyō, Tokyo, where the school buildings were constructed by 1936.

It was established as Ochanomizu University in 1949 and became a National University Corporation under Japan's National University Corporation Act in 2004. Its faculties of graduate schools with Home Economics (master's program), Humanities and Science (doctoral program), started respectively in 1963 and 1976, and they were reorganized into the Graduate School of Humanities and Science starting in 1997 with master's research courses in humanities, science, and home economics. Since 2007, the Graduate School was positioned to lead and strengthen education and research when they reorganized Graduate School of Humanities and Science to the Institute for Human Life Innovation and the Institute for Education and Human Development.

== School Song ==
みがかずば Migakazuba is a poem-based school song which was composed by Empress Shōken.

みがかずば

玉も鏡も なにかせん 学びの道も かくこそありけれ

Without polishing,

Gemstones or bronze mirror will not shine and transform into jewelry,

Likewise, studying continuously is important.

The song was sung by the students of the affiliated elementary school before Helen Keller on April 26, 1937 in the Kiindo, auditorium.

== Alumni ==
- Sada Orihara – the first woman to attend the Tokyo Institute of Technology in Japan
- Toshiko Yuasa – nuclear physicist who worked in France, the first Japanese female physicist

== Affiliated institutions ==
Ochanomizu's campus also contains a number of schools for pre-university students affiliated with the university: Ochanomizu Kindergarten, Ochanomizu Elementary, Ochanomizu Junior High School, and Ochanomizu High School.

In March 2022, Prince Hisahito of Akishino graduated from Ochanomizu Junior High School.
