= Michiko Togo =

Japanese female engineer (1927–2018)

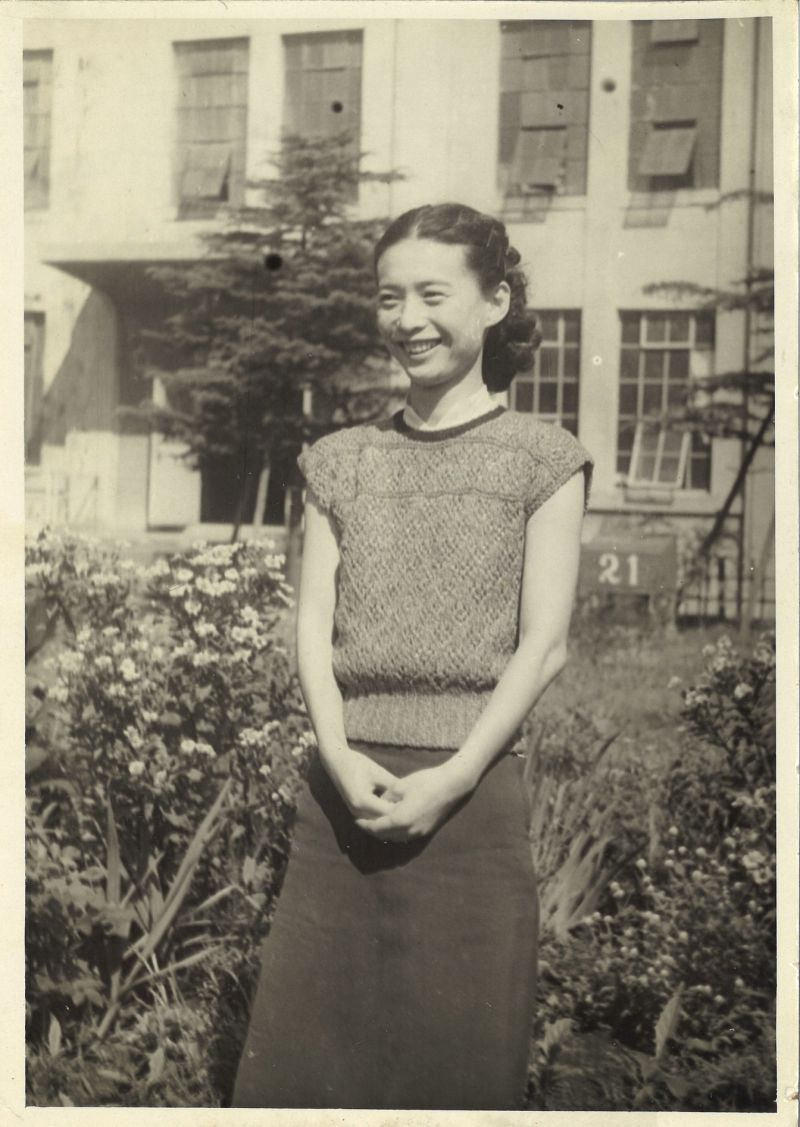
Michiko Togo, c. 1948

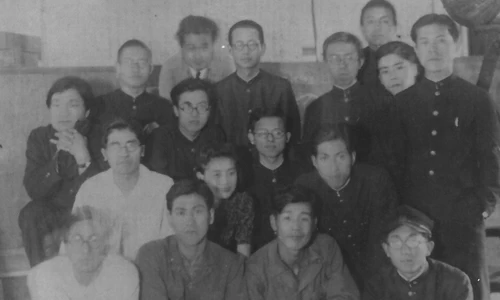
Michiko Togo with classmates, c. 1948

Michiko Togo (東郷美智子), (1927-2018), was one of the first Japanese female engineers, a pioneering rikejo (Japanese woman in a STEM field). She passed the difficult entrance exam, only 21% of people passed the exam, to Tokyo Institute of Technology (Tokyo Tech) in 1947. She came from two generations of scientists; so they supported her in her educational goals. Her maternal grandfather was Kunihiko Iwadare, the founder of NEC corporation. Iwadare had worked with Thomas Edison at Edison Machine Works in Schenectady, New York. Her father had also graduated from Tokyo Tech. A few other women had graduated from Tokyo Tech, but Togo was the first to do so in the field of engineering.

Togo's goal in becoming an engineer was to help Japan recover from World War II. While she experienced culture shock at the school, her biggest problem was the woman's restroom. She eventually got the administration to allow her to put a "women only" paper sign on one bathroom door. She experienced other embarrassments but was also respected as the only girl student. Many of her classmates in the Department of Electrical Engineering had been in combat in WWII. After graduating in 1950, she felt it was important to study the country that had defeated Japan in the war, so she first studied Rockford University in Illinois and then at Bryn Mawr College in Philadelphia for two years. While there she met Shigeru Yoshioka, from Kamakura, a seminary student. When Togo returned to Japan, she began working for Toshiba Corporation. She married Yoshioka when he returned one year later and they had three children. Togo spent much of her time on gathering documents on the history of Tokyo Tech and on electrical engineering education.

== See also ==
- Sada Orihara
