= Pailin Chuchottaworn =

Thai businessman (born 1956)

- ไพรินทร์ ชูโชติถาวร
- Born: 8 July 1956 (age 70); Bangkok, Thailand
- Education: Chulalongkorn University; Tokyo Institute of Technology
- Occupation: Businessman
- Title: CEO of PTT
- Term: 2011–2015
- Successor: Tevin Vongvanich

Pailin Chuchottaworn (Thai: ไพรินทร์ ชูโชติถาวร, RTGS: Phairin Chuchotithawon; born 8 July 1956) is a Thai businessman, and from 2011 to 2015 was the chief executive officer (CEO) of PTT Public Company Limited, a Thai state-owned oil and gas company, and a Fortune Global 500 company.

== Education ==
Chuchottaworn was born in 1956. He has a bachelor's degree from Chulalongkorn University, a master's degree from the Tokyo Institute of Technology, and a doctorate in from Tokyo Institute of Technology, all in chemical engineering.

== Career ==
Chuchottaworn was the CEO and president of PTT from September 2011 to September 2015. He is the founder and chairman of Kamnoetvidya Science Academy, Rayong, Thailand, which is run by PTT.

Pailin was appointed Deputy Transport Minister in December 2017 until 2019.
