= Kunihiko Iwadare =

Japanese businessman

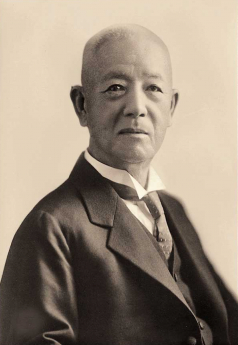
- Undated portrait of Iwadare
- Born: 15 August 1857
- Died: 20 December 1941 (aged 84)
- Occupation: Businessman

Kunihiko Iwadare (岩垂 邦彦, Iwadare Kunihiko; August 15, 1857 – December 20, 1941) was a Japanese businessman. A graduate of the Imperial College of Engineering (Kobu Daigaku) in Tokyo, he worked as a telegraph engineer for the Japanese government.

== Biography ==
Iwadare left Japan in 1886 and traveled to New York. He was introduced to Charles Batchelor, an assistant of Thomas Edison. Iwadare was hired to work in an Edison facility in Manhattan at Goerck Street. Iwadare was transferred to Edison Machine Works in Schenectady, New York in January 1887. His granddaughter was the pioneering engineer Michiko Togo.

Iwadare returned to Japan, hoping to participate in building the electrical industry in Japan. He first joined Osaka Dento (Osaka Electric Lamp Company) as an electrical engineer, and after eight years resigned from his post to start his own business as a general sales agent in Japan for General Electric and Western Electric companies.

In 1895, Western Electric wished to expand their telephone equipment sales business in Japan and proposed a limited partnership with Iwadare. Their representative was Walter Tenney Carleton. Iwadare accepted the proposal and a new firm was created in August, 1898. In 1899, changes to treaties between Japan and Western countries went into effect. The limited partnership created in 1898 was restructured into the joint stock company, Nippon Electric Co. Ltd. Western Electric held 54% of the stock. Iwadare was named managing director of what is now known as NEC Corporation. He became chairman of the board in 1926.
