= Sada Orihara =

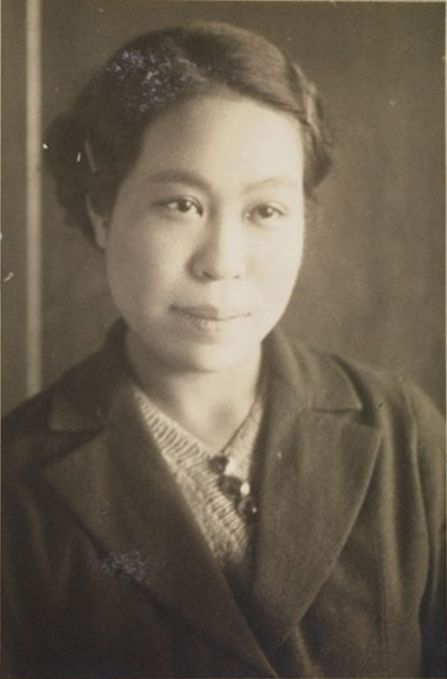
Sada Orihara circa 1939

Sada Orihara (折原貞) (1908–1960) was the first woman to attend the Tokyo Institute of Technology in Japan.

== Education ==
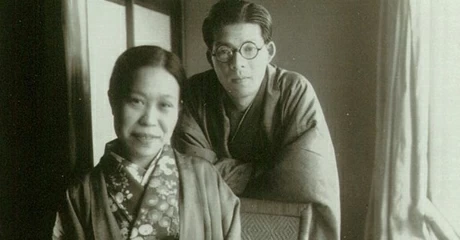
Sada Orihara and her husband Kiyoshi Takiura circa 1939

Orihara was educated at the Maebashi Girls' Senior High School and the Tokyo Women's Higher Normal School (now Ochanomizu University). She then enrolled as a scholarship student in the Department of Dye Chemistry at Tokyo Institute of Technology in Meguro, Tokyo, Japan. She graduated in 1931 and began her career back at the Tokyo Women's Higher Normal School, where she was first employed as a teacher. She was later promoted to assistant professor.

== Private life ==
Orihara married Kiyoshi Takiura, who she had met whilst a student at Tokyo Tech, in 1939. Both her scientific career and married life were interrupted after World War II and the Pacific War broke out. She had two sons with her husband and died in 1960.

== See also ==
- Michiko Togo
