= National Junior College =

Junior college in Singapore

- Maktab Rendah Kebangsaan (Malay) 国家初级学院 (Chinese) தேசியத் தொடக்கக் கல்லூரி (Tamil)

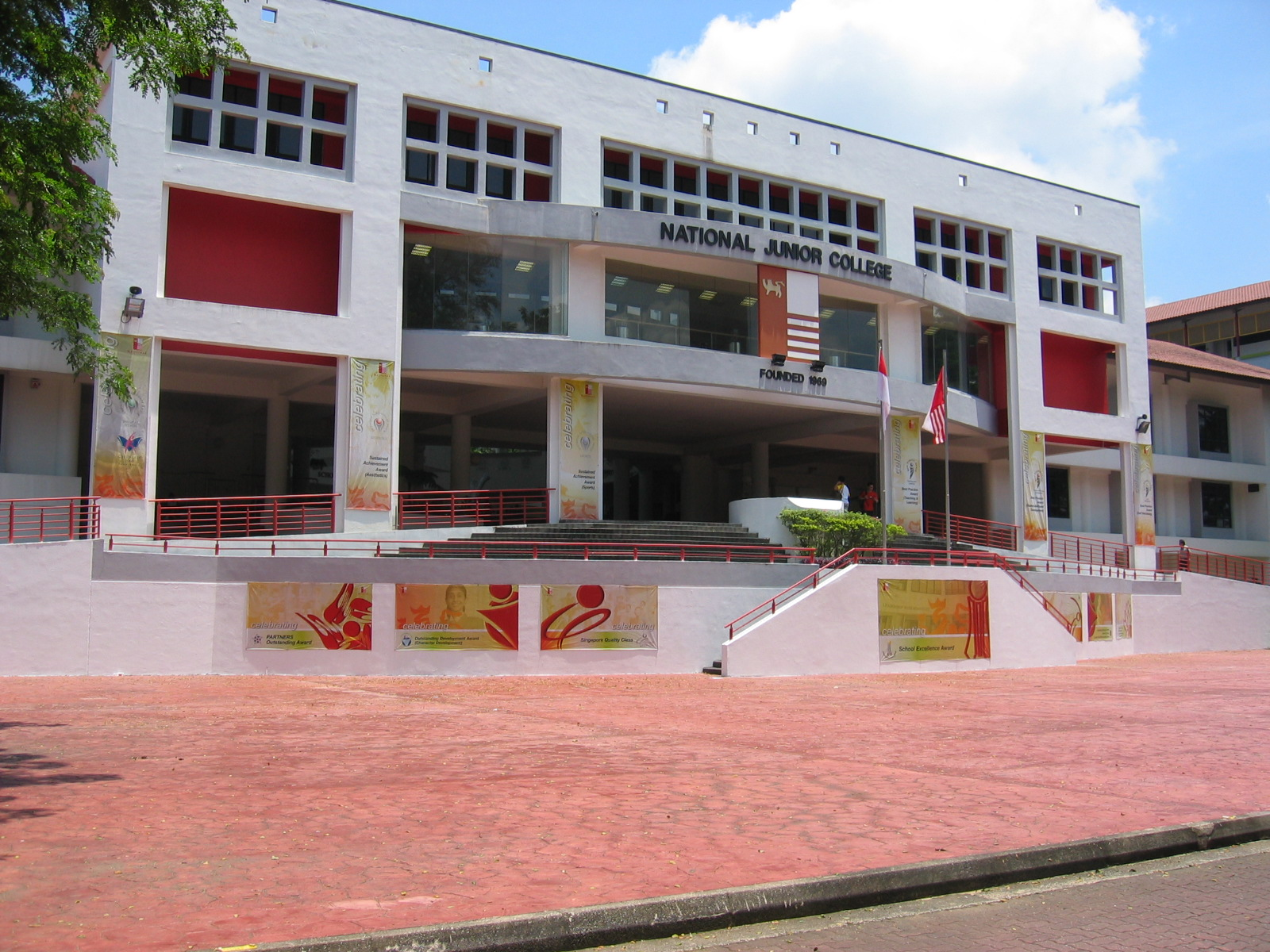

Location
- 37 Hillcrest Road, Singapore 288913; Singapore
- 1.330278°N 103.804167°E

Information
- Type: Public; Government
- Motto: Service with Honour
- Established: 20 January 1969; 57 years ago
- Principal: Lucy Toh (郑瑞龄)
- Enrollment: 1,900
- Color: Red White Grey
- Mission: College of the Nation: Home of scholars and leaders who Serve with Honour.
- Values: Loyalty with Integrity, Scholarship with Creativity, Leadership with Sensitivity, Service with Honour
- Website: nationaljc.moe.edu.sg

National Junior College (NJC) is a government junior college located in Bukit Timah, Singapore. Established in 1969, it was the first government junior college in Singapore. NJC offers a two-year course for pre-university students and a six-year Integrated Programme, both leading to the Singapore-Cambridge GCE Advanced Level examinations. It is among top 5 junior colleges in the country in terms of minimum entry cut off points.

== History ==
First announced by Prime Minister Lee Kuan Yew in May 1965 as a "super secondary boarding school", it was the first specialised co-educational government school established in independent Singapore for top pre-university students.

It was announced in December 1965 by then Minister for Education Ong Pang Boon that a centralised "junior college" system would be established to optimise the use of teachers and laboratory facilities and to create more educational opportunities for pre-university students. This system replaced the previous pre-university education conducted at various secondary schools across the country. In 1967, construction began on the first institution that operated under this arrangement, which was named National Junior College. On 20 January 1969, an inaugural assembly was held with the pioneer batch of 572 students. The college was officially declared open by Prime Minister Lee Kuan Yew on 14 May 1970.

Unlike other pre-university schools of the time, students were given the freedom and flexibility to opt for their subjects under the college's lecture and tutorial system. This resulted in over 40 different subject combinations. Besides General Paper, which was compulsory, other subjects offered to students included Art, Biology, Chemistry, Economics, English Literature, Geography, History and Mathematics.

In keeping with its name and philosophy, the College claims no affiliation with any secondary school but instead draws its students from a wide spectrum. In addition, Singapore students learn alongside students from India, China, Hong Kong, Korea as well as ASEAN countries such as Vietnam, Indonesia, Malaysia and Thailand. NJC also plays host to German, PRC, Taiwanese, Vietnamese and Japanese students in exchange programmes.

In January 1985, National Junior College introduced the Art Elective Programme, and subsequently rolled out the Humanities Scheme in 1987 with experienced British teachers specially arranged to tutor students in various humanities subjects. In 1992, NJC became the first junior college to offer German as part of its Language Elective Programme.

The college introduced the four-year Integrated Programme in 2004, allowing students to take on secondary education in the college and bypass the Singapore-Cambridge GCE Ordinary Level examination. The programme was later expanded to a six-year Integrated Programme in 2009.

== Principal ==
Principal	Years served
Lim Kim Woon	1969 – 1975
Chow Kye Lock	1975
Yeo Lai Cheng	1976 – 1979
Wee Heng Tin	1980 – 1981
Lim Bok Hai	1982 – 1984
Chan Tung Fong	1985 – 1988
Goh Chi Lan	1989 – 1995
Maureen Ng	1996 - 2001
Virginia Cheng	2002 – 2013
Ang Pow Chew	2014 – 2022
Lucy Toh	2023 (Incumbent)

== Identity and culture ==
=== Uniform ===
The uniform for male students is a shirt with shoulder epaulettes, secured by square silver buttons embossed with the school crest. The uniform for female students is similar, except that there are no pockets on the blouse and they have a pleated A-line skirt. Students also wear a pin, depicting the college crest, on the uniform's left collar. The main colour of the school uniform is grey.

=== College Anthem and Song ===
There are two official college songs – the College Anthem and a College Song, entitled "The National Dream". The College Anthem was composed by Mr. Leong Yoon Pin, a renowned Singaporean composer whose works include the opera Bunga Mawar and the concert overture Dayong Sampan. The College Anthem is written in Malay, one of the four official languages in the Republic of Singapore.

=== House System ===
The house system at National Junior College was established in 1999, replacing the previous Department system. Through this system, students across the different cohorts get to bond together through intra-college house competition and activities. The six houses of the college and their respective mascots are as follows:

House	Color	Mascot
Aerius	Purple	Eagle
Aqua	Blue	Orca
Ignis	Red	Phoenix
Lignum	Orange	Beaver
Solaris	Yellow	Lion
Terra	Green	Gazelle

== Campus ==
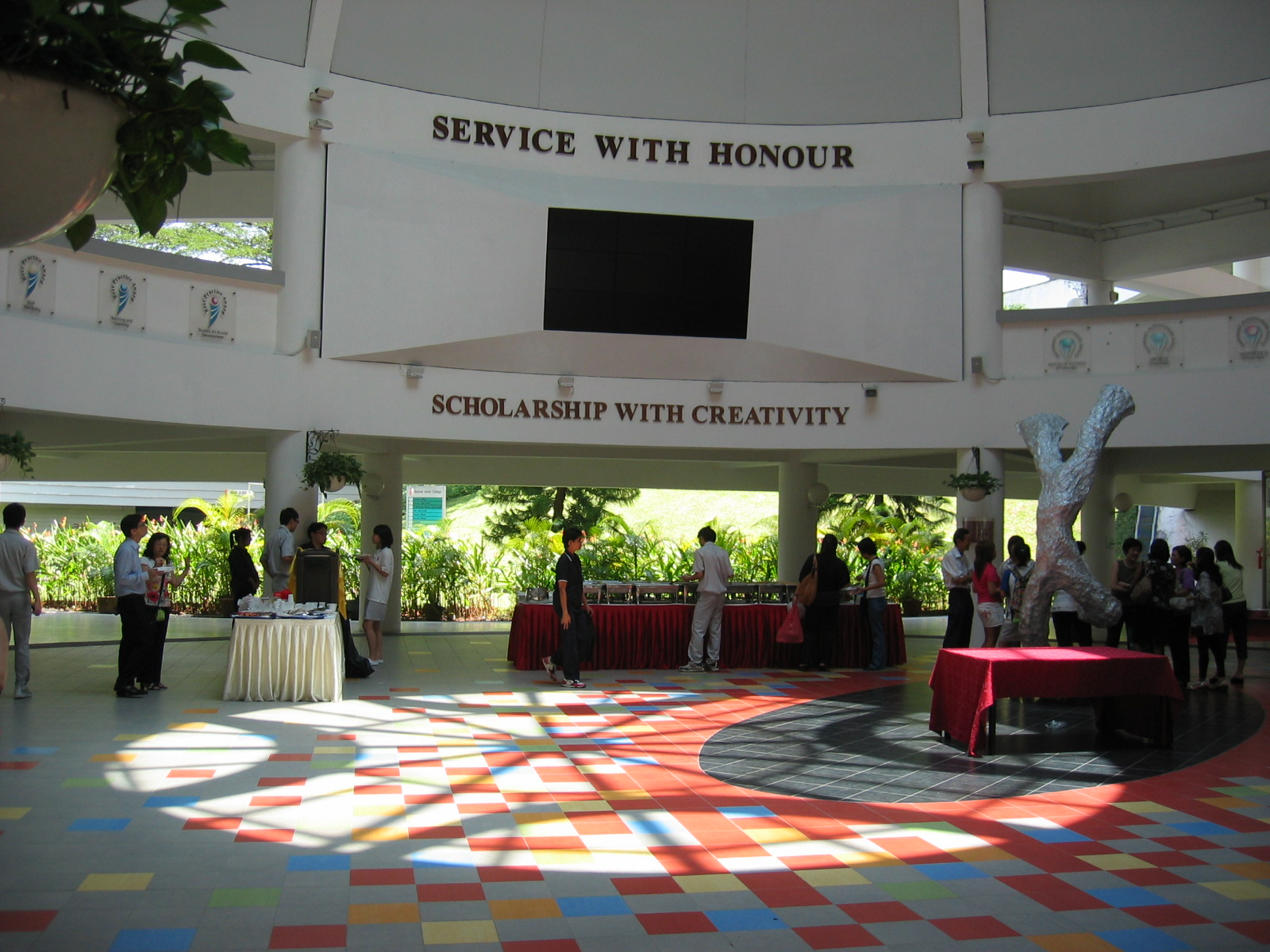
The atrium of National Junior College

Work started on National Junior College's campus in September 1967. Located at the junction of Linden Road and Dunearn Road, the campus was completed at a cost of SGD $1.6 million. The original campus featured an audio-visual lab, 10 science laboratories, a library, two lecture theatres, 30 classrooms, nine tutorial rooms, an assembly hall, a canteen, an administrative block with other activity rooms. National Junior College used this campus until 1997, when it shifted to its present location at Hillcrest Road.

The current campus of National Junior College is located at 37 Hillcrest Road in Bukit Timah, houses both the Junior High and Senior High sections of the school, as well as a boarding school. This current campus features five lecture theatres (with two theatres having a seating capacity of 500), three tutorial room blocks and three information technology rooms. The campus also features three Sigma labs, which are equipped with sophisticated scientific instruments and equipment to promote science research in the college. The college has a dedicated art block as part of the Art Elective Programme (Singapore) (AEP). This Art Centre contains facilities such as a 3-dimensional work-pottery-sculpture studio, a drawing and painting studio, a pottery kiln room, and a photography darkroom to enable students in the AEP to experiment with different art media.

In May 2019, the school collaborated with food technology start-up Life3 Biotech to launch an agriculture-technology facility.

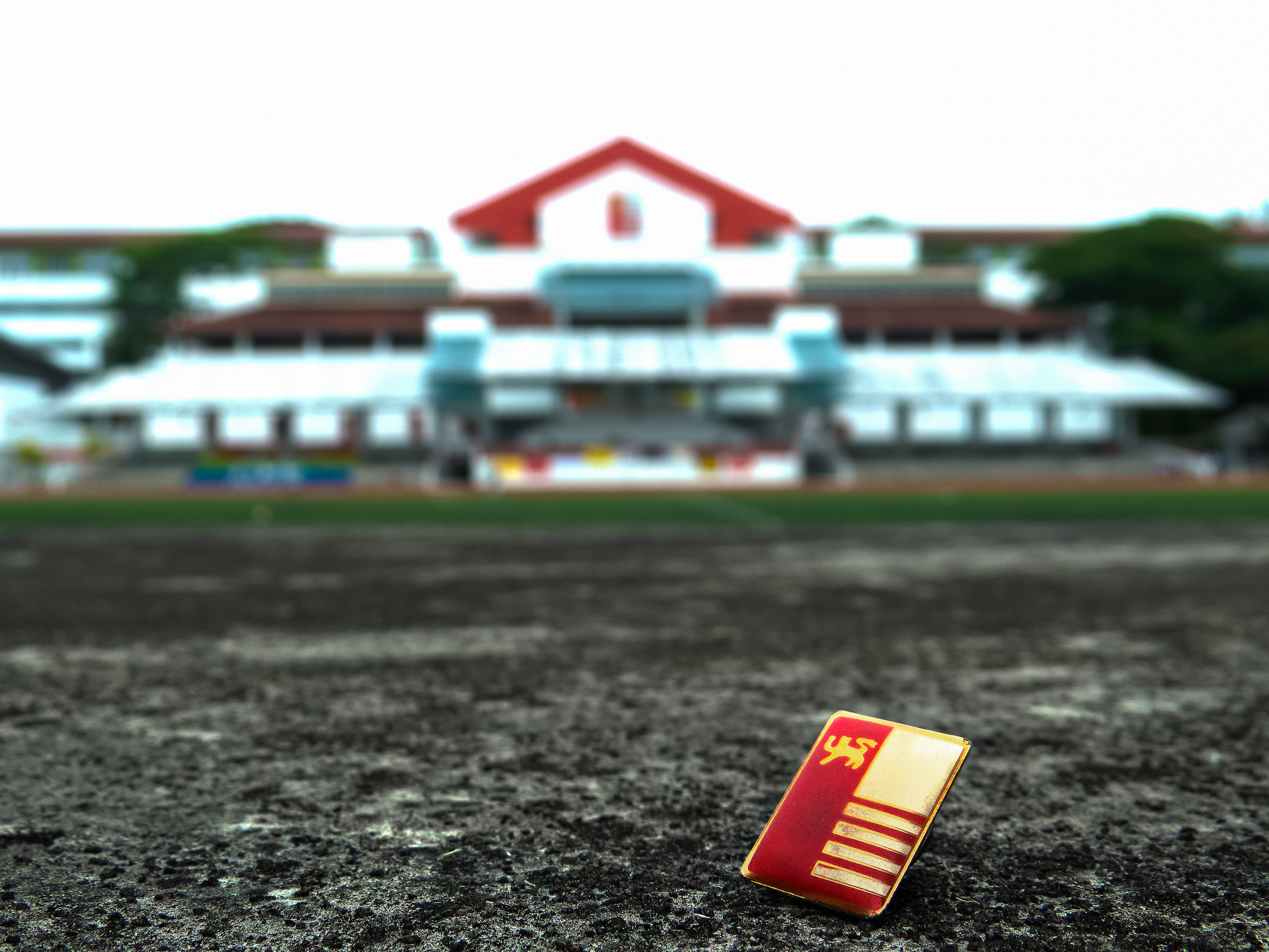
National Junior College with a College Pin in the foreground

=== Boarding school ===
At the 2007 Ministry of Education Workplan Seminar, it was announced that five schools, including National Junior College, will each start their own boarding programme. Thus, National Junior College's boarding school was constructed to cater to the new programme and it was officially opened on 16 May 2009. Built at a cost of SGD $20 million, this boarding school had 250 rooms housing around 500 students and teachers. In addition to housing foreign students, who make up half of the boarding school population, it also housed students who are participating in the college's Enhanced Boarding Programme.

The boarding school was officially closed down in Dec 2024.

== Academic information ==
National Junior College offers two education routes that lead to the GCE 'A’ Level examinations:

- 6 year Integrated Programme (Years 7 to 12, 13-18 years old)
- 2 year JC Programme (Years 11 to 12, 17-18 years old)

Students who are admitted to the NJC Integrated Programme (at Junior High 1 and 3 level) will skip the GCE ‘O’ Level and take the GCE ‘A’ Level examinations at the end of their sixth year in NJC.

Students who are admitted to NJC JC Programme (at Senior High 1 level) must have taken their GCE 'O’ Levels examinations or equivalent. They will take the GCE 'A’ Level examinations at the end of their second year in NJC, like all other students taking the JC route towards the exam.

=== Special Programmes ===
In National Junior College, various special programmes are also offered in addition to the standard school curriculum. Such programmes aim to develop student interest in academic and non-academic fields beyond their chosen field of academic studies.

==== Art Elective Programme ====
National Junior College was the first school to offer the Art Elective Programme (AEP) in 1985 to allow student with a passion in Art to develop their talents. Under this programme, the college also provides specialised facilities to allow students to experiment with different art media. At the end of this programme, students are expected to sit for Art as a subject at the Singapore-Cambridge GCE Advanced Level at both the Higher 2 and Higher 3 levels. The college was also one of the six college to pioneer the Humanities Programme scheme in 1987, a scheme by Singapore's Ministry of Education to encourage students to pursue the study of humanities at the pre-university level. In 1992, German was introduced as a subject for the first time in a junior college under the Language Elective Programme.

==== Music Programme ====
NJC also offers its own Music Programme, not to be confused with the MOE's MEP (Music Elective Programme). It started in 2006 and is currently offered only to Junior High Students; previously, students could take Music at H2 level for the 'A' levels.

==== Humanities Integrated Programme ====
The Humanities Integrated Programme (HIP) has been offered at NJC since 2020.

==== Language Elective Programme ====
NJC has offered the Malay and Tamil Language Elective Programmes (LEP) from 2020.

==== Science Special Programmes ====
National Junior College also offer special programmes related to Science subjects. Some distinct programmes are featured below:

- Science Training and Research (STaR) Programme, a Science research programme. Students get to conduct their research together with the college's local and international science research partners, such as A*STAR and the Korea Science Academy of KAIST. Under this programme, there is also the International Research Exchange Programme (IREP). Students selected to take part in this programme will embark on a year long of research with overseas partners around the world, such as Suzanne Cory High School in Australia, Waseda University Honjo Senior High School in Japan, Camborne Science and International Academy in the United Kingdom and many more. Senior High students can also participate in the NUS-A*STAR-NJC Science Research programme, where their work will be assessed by the National University of Singapore and will count as a Higher 3 credit at the Singapore-Cambridge GCE Advanced Level examinations.
- Advanced Inquiry in Mathematics (AIM) Programme, a Mathematics enrichment programme. This programme allows students with an interest and strong ability in mathematics to participate in additional enrichment programmes during their Senior High Year 1.
- Special Programme in Inquiry Research (SPIRE), a research programme compulsory for all Junior High 2 students. Students will embark on a year-long research project in one of the following domains- Chemistry, Biology, Physics, Mathematics, Computing or Humanities. The programme culminates in the submission of a full-length research report and a research fair.

==== International and Local Summits and Conferences ====
As a college specialising in research, National Junior College also regularly hosts many conferences. This includes the International Humanities Symposium, Pre-University Summit and Singapore International STEM Innovation Challenge (SISTEMIC). These summits and conferences are jointly organised with the Ministry of Education, and is participated by more than 70 schools locally and internationally.

=== Enhanced Boarding Programme ===
The National Junior College's boarding programme was launched in 2009 together with the opening of the boarding school. Under this programme, students stay in the boarding school for slightly less than one school term (5~8 weeks). Students also participate in the various activities planned during their stay. Such programmes include aesthetics programmes, leadership development programmes and night adventures. Since 2009, all Integrated Programme students from the college have participated in this compulsory programme.

== Co-curricular activities ==
National Junior College provides its students with a wide range of co-curriculum activities. Sports and games include badminton, basketball, canoeing & dragonboating, climbing, floorball, football, hockey, netball, shooting, softball, squash, table tennis, tennis, touch rugby and track and field/cross country. There are also performing arts such as Chinese orchestra/Guzheng ensemble, choir, guitar ensemble, string orchestra, symphonic band and dance groups (Chinese, Malay, Indian, Western). Students can also participate in various clubs and societies such as the Aesthetics Club, AVA & PA Club, Debating & Dramatic Societies (English, Chinese, Malay, Tamil), Greenlink Club, Interact Club and Outdoor Activities Club.

=== Student Council ===
The NJC Student Council consists of two wings - a Junior Wing comprising Junior High 2 to 4 students, alongside a Senior Wing comprising Junior High 4 to Senior High 2 students. Both wings of the Student Council work hand-in-hand to implement initiatives, such as the Junior High and Senior High Orientation programme for new students, that are aimed at improving the welfare of the student population. While in office, Student Councillors will be split into various committees that are in charge of the planning and execution of initiatives that fall under their respective roles. Some of these committees include: the College Outreach Committee which leverages on different types of media and design to reach out to the public and the student population events; the Student Development Committee focuses on the development of students in the college by planning events such as Career Festival and Student Investiture; the NJCommunity Welfare Committee which aims to build a more supportive culture amongst students through the setting up of platforms allowing for students to display appreciation for and encouragement towards one another; and the College Spirit Committee which rallies all NJCians together in an effort to foster a strong school spirit. In addition, the Councillors will also be allocated to event committees such as Orientation and Open House.

All prospective Student Councillors must first undergo a rigorous selection process before taking office; each term in office lasts for a period of 1 year. In particular, the Student Council President and Vice-President are elected to office by the student population and teachers. The Student Council is run by an overall Executive Committee consisting of the incumbent President, Vice-President, Honorary Secretary, Honorary Treasurer, Heads of Standing Committees as well as the six House Captains.

== Notable alumni ==
National Junior College has nurtured many notable alumni in various fields such as politics, civil service, business, academics, as well as entertainment. This includes former Prime Minister of Singapore Lee Hsien Loong, opposition politician Chen Show Mao, and Singaporean spy for China Yeo Jun Wei

== See also ==
- Education in Singapore
