= Kamnoetvidya Science Academy =

- โรงเรียนกำเนิดวิทย์
- Emblem of KVIS

Location
- 999 Moo 1 Wangchan Valley, Wangchan; Pa Yup Nai; Wang Chan, Rayong, 21210; Thailand
- Coordinates: 13°00′05.3″N 101°26′53.4″E

Information
- Former name: Rayong Science Academy (RASA)
- School type: Private school, boarding Science school
- Motto: दन्तो सेट्ठो मनुस्सेसु (danto seṭṭho manussesu) (Best amongst men is the subdued one)
- Religious affiliation: Buddhism
- Patron saint: Phra Mahāpāramīnubhāvavisuddhi Anuttarasaṅgāmavijaya
- Established: 6 August 2015
- Founder: Pailin Chuchottaworn
- School board: Kamnoetvidya Science Academy Governing Board
- School district: Wangchan
- Authority: RASA Foundation
- Oversight: Ministry of Education
- Chairperson: Pailin Chuchottaworn
- Principal: Boonchoat Paosawatyanyong
- Grades: 10–12 (Mathayom 4–6)
- Gender: Coeducational
- Age range: 15 - 18
  - Grade 10: 73
  - Grade 11: 71
  - Grade 12: 72
- Language: Thai, English
- Campus: Wangchan Valley
- Campus size: 25.6 ha
- Campus type: Rural
- Colour: Purple and Green
- Slogan: The Academy of Knowledge Genesis
- Song: Purple Green Blood (Thai: โลหิตม่วงเขียว)
- Mascot: goose
- School fees: full scholarship awarded to all students
- Website: www.kvis.ac.th

Kamnoetvidya Science Academy (Thai: โรงเรียนกำเนิดวิทย์, RTGS: Kamnoet Wit; also known colloquially as KVIS) is a high school in Thailand. The school uses a customised curriculum mainly focused on mathematics, science, engineering and technology. Native English speakers are employed to teach English as well as other subjects. Apart from English, various other languages which are Chinese, Korean, Japanese, Spanish, German and French are taught to students.

== History ==
Kamnoetvidya Science Academy, with the former name of Rayong Science Academy (RASA), was founded in 2013. The name Kamnoetvidya, which literally means “The Genesis of Knowledge”, was given by Princess Maha Chakri Sirindhorn on 6 August 2015 presided over the grand opening ceremony of the school. Kamnoetvidya Science Academy is supported by the Power of Learning foundation with an endowment fund provided by the PTT Public Company Limited to ensure sustainability, prosperity, and longevity of the academy. The conception of Kamnoetvidya Science Academy was the result of a farsighted vision and a cumulated passion of Dr. Pailin Chuchottaworn, then the chief executive officer and president of PTT Public Company Limited, who wishes to see Thailand emerge as a strong power in science and technology. Dr. Thongchai Chewprecha, the founding principal, retired from his position in 2018 and currently, he is succeeded by Dr. Rachain Kosanlavit. Currently, Dr. Boonchoat Paosawatyanyong is the principal of the school. Meanwhile, Dr. Thongchai continues to contribute as Principal Emeritus.

== Facilities ==
A scanning electron microscope is available in the campus for research and experimental purpose. KVIS is one of the few educational institutions to own an electron microscope. The engineering workshop laboratory is equipped with 3D printers, lathe machines and 3D modelling software. Microcontroller Laboratory is equipped with various microcontroller kits, electronic oscilloscope, robotic kits, solar panel kits, etc. The Computer Science Lab is equipped with Dell all-in-one computers with Intel Core i7 processors, NVIDIA GPU and digital white boards. The academic resource centre is equipped with most of the scientific journals from Springer and Science Direct. The entire campus is equipped with wired and wireless high speed internet connectivity.

== Admission process ==
An entrance exam with two tier process is open to all Thai nationals pursuing secondary 3 (Grade 9) every year. This exam is conducted in various centres all over the country.

== Academics ==
Students at Kamnoetvidya Science Academy receive a full scholarship. Kamnoetvidya Science Academy received 6 billion baht ($185.3 million) for construction of an academic park, further enhancing its facilities to support innovative learning and research.

== International academic exchange programs ==
KVIS engages in academic exchanges with overseas prestigious universities, research centres and other related institutions for the gifted.

=== Partnership schools ===
Country	Gifted institutes
United States of America (1)	North Carolina School of Science and Mathematics
Republic of Korea (2)	Korea Science Academy; Gyeonggi Science High School
Russia (2)	Kolmogorov Math and Science High School; Lyceum Physical Technical High School

== Press releases ==
On 3 April 2015, Dr. Pailin Chuchottaworn said that KVIS, as a part of PTT Group, will strive hard to operate alongside the local community in Rayong Province, the second home of PTT, regarding social care and environmental sustainability. It was developed to have a lifestyle comparable to other leading cities.

== Club activities ==
Club activities are included in the KVIS curriculum. Various clubs, like judo club, muay Thai club, music club, gardening club, BNK48 study club, Kyōgi karuta club, jogging club, and more, are currently functioning in the school campus. All clubs function every Monday and Thursday.
