= Australian Science and Mathematics School =

Coordinates: 35°1′7.99″S 138°34′30.75″E

Location
- Carpark 18, Flinders University, Sturt Road, Bedford Park SA 5042; Flinders University, Bedford Park, South Australia 5042; Adelaide, South Australia, 5042

Information
- Type: Public
- Established: 2003
- Principal: Kylie Eggers
- Faculty: 40
- Secondary years taught: 10th through 12th grades
- Enrolment: Approximately 420
- Language: English
- Hours in school day: 6.67
- Houses: Gold, Red, Blue, Green
- Website: https://asms.sa.edu.au/

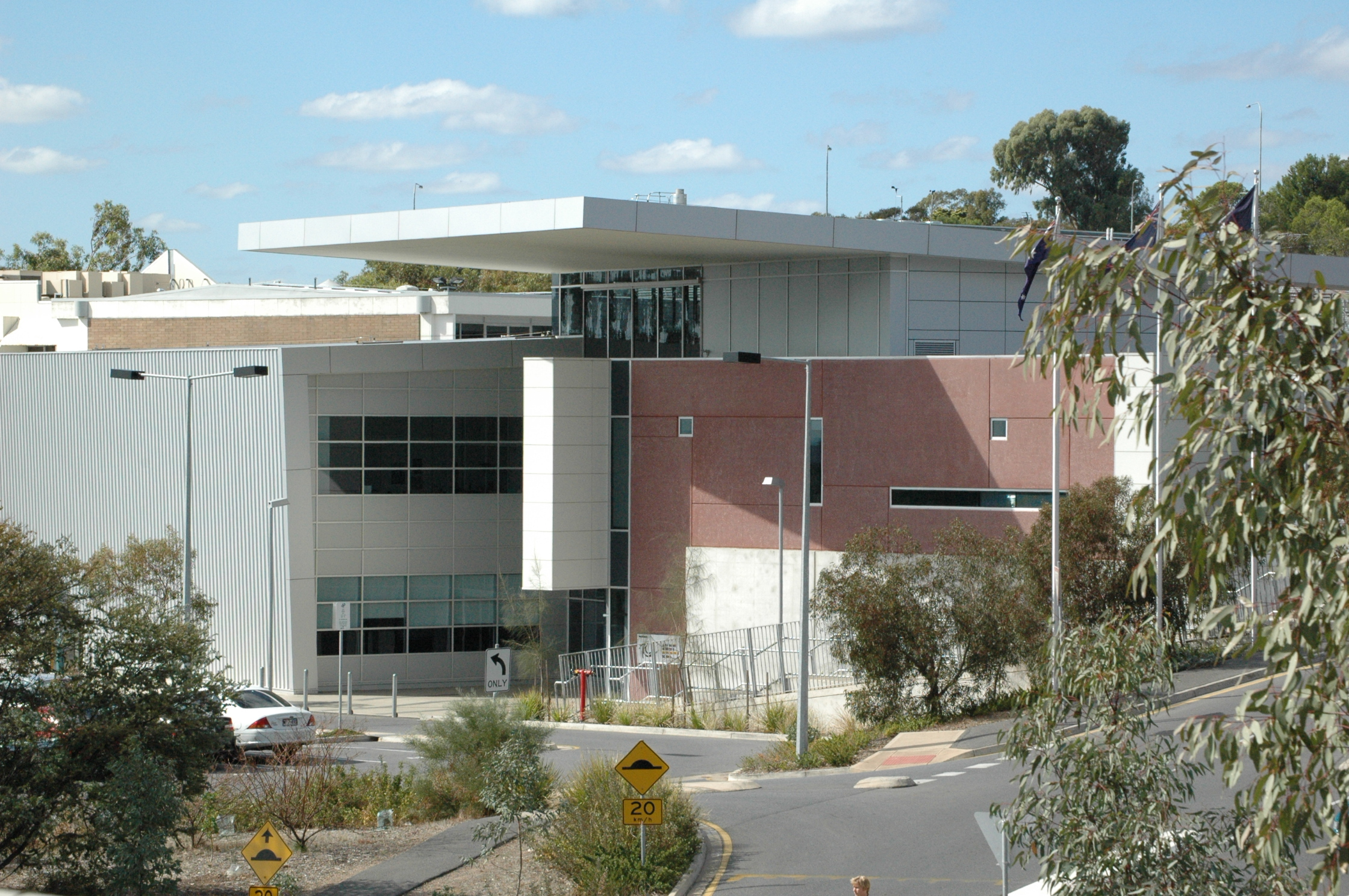
The Australian Science and Mathematics School

The Australian Science and Mathematics School (ASMS) is a coeducational public senior high school for Years 10–12 located on the Sturt campus of Flinders University in Bedford Park, a southern suburb of Adelaide, the capital of South Australia. As the school is unzoned, it attracts students from all across the Adelaide metropolitan area as well as some regional and interstate locations, in addition to international students. The goal of the school is to prepare its students for university, particularly in the fields of mathematics and science. The ASMS is unconventional in its approach to education, emphasising a love of learning in both students and teaching staff; students are given the freedom to take control of their own education. ASMS aims to make students aware of their own learning and for them to become self-directed in the way they complete academic tasks.

== Overview ==
The Australian Science and Mathematics School was opened in 2003 and has a total of around 400 students. As the school is designed to provide an adult environment for senior school students, there is no school uniform policy, which promotes a variety of culture and social styles and structures. A key feature of the ASMS is the productive relationship between the school and the Flinders University, on which the campus is located; the ASMS shares many resources with the university, including the library, cafeteria, student services, transport, recreational areas and car parks, in addition to booked access to lecture theatres and specialist science and support facilities. Furthermore, students at the ASMS in collaboration with Flinders University's Science and Technology Enterprise Partnership (STEP) may be involved in research projects in the business, industry and university sectors.

== Curriculum ==
The ASMS is a specialist science and mathematics school, however it offers a comprehensive curriculum which covers all learning areas necessary for students to achieve their South Australian Certificate of Education (SACE) qualification. The Year 10/11 curriculum is organised into interdisciplinary Central Studies; these alternate every year to ensure that a student will not do the same subjects twice. The Year 12 curriculum consists of standard SACE Stage 2 subjects, such as the various Mathematics, Science, English and Humanities subjects.

In 2022, the 10/11 students took part in "Field Trip Week", which involved activities both outside and inside the school premises. The goal of this week was to extend the students' knowledge in their current Central Studies. This week was intended to rotate with a similar week (Curiously In the Community (CIC) Week) but was then scrapped due to unknown reasons.

The ASMS also hosts an International Science Week (ISF), in which international and domestic students come together with ASMS students to explore areas of science. Projects are presented at the end of the week. Additionally, the school has "Curiosity in the Community Week", allowing students to engage with the community and apply science topics.

== Adventure Space/Passion Project ==
The ASMS also provides special activities for Year 10 and 11 students in the form of Adventure Space. Examples of these include Dance, Cryptography, Robotics, Aviation, Australian Space Design Competition, Paramedical Pathways, Electronics, Creative Writing, and Palaeontology. While not assessed, they do provide an opportunity to interact with university life, as well as an opportunity to take part in learning focused productive extra-curricular activities. As of 2021, the ASMS has renamed this program to 'Passion Project", where any personal or group project within school limitations can be undertaken, rather than specific areas.
