= Camborne Science and International Academy =

Camborne Science & International Academy
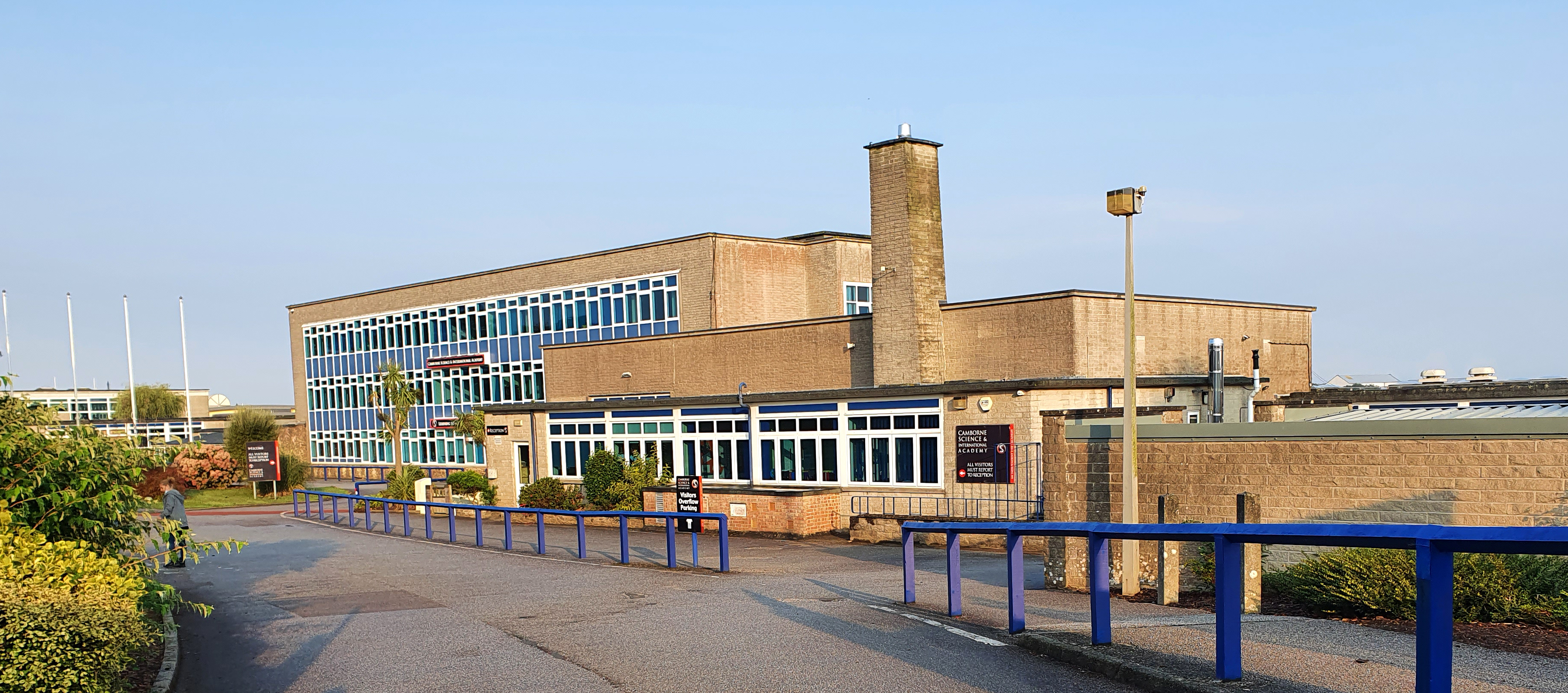
- Camborne School, Cornwall - September 2022

Location
- Cranberry Road; Camborne, Cornwall, TR14 7PP; England; 50°12′49″N 5°18′36″W

Information
- Type: Academy
- Motto: Learning to be Extraordinary
- Established: 1956
- Department for Education URN: 136524 Tables
- Ofsted: Reports
- Chair of Governors: Stephen Webb
- Principal: Emma Haase
- Gender: Coeducational
- Age: 11 to 18
- Enrolment: 1,803
- Houses: Masai, Maori, Aztec, and Abenaki
- Colour: Maroon Black
- Publication: Community News
- Website: http://www.cambornescience.co.uk/

Camborne Science and International Academy (formerly Camborne Science & Community College) is an academy school and sixth form in Camborne, Cornwall, England, UK. The school teaches 1,803 11 to 18-year-olds.

== School ==
When the school opened on 18 April 1956 it was known as Treswithian Secondary Modern and was equipped for the use of 508 pupils. It expanded to become Camborne School and Community College with the introduction of the Comprehensive school system, absorbing the disestablished Camborne Grammar School. In 2003 it gained specialist status as a Science College, and it subsequently underwent another change in name. In April 2011 the school obtained academy status, and on 1 September 2011 the school was renamed as Camborne Science and International Academy (CSIA). Since then, the school has been extended with a £3.2 million Design Technology block, incorporating subjects such as: Design Technology, Food Technology and Graphical Drawing. Moreover, the school’s main canteen, toilet facilities and of the Sixth Form area have been refurbished.

In September 2016, the school opened up a STEM centre for students gifted and talented in Science and Maths. This centre is called Nexus and is the first of its kind in the country. Nexus has developed links with universities such as Oxford. CSIA also has a sixth form for students in year 12 and 13.

In the most recent Ofsted inspection, the report concluded the school to be 'Good with outstanding features'.

It was announced by the government in March 2010 that the Cornwall Council, the school's Local Authority had secured £69m funding, a portion of which is rumoured to be used to rebuild the school on the current site of one of their sports' fields, although the funding was to have been made under the Building Schools for the Future (BSF) programme which was later cut back.

== Location ==
Although Camborne School is located within a ten-minute walk of the main town, it has two main fields and an athletics track. It shares a boundary with Camborne RFC, home to the town Rugby team, as well as – until 2010 – the Cornish Pirates.

== Uniform ==
The school has a uniform code which consists of an all-black blazer, black v-neck jumper, white shirt, school tie, trousers or a skirt and all black shoes (leather or leather look). A competition to design the logo and tie was held during April and May 2009, with proceeds from entries being donated to Children's hospice south west's Precious Lives Appeal, the school's charity of choice. As part of their work as a Community School, this competition was opened up to staff, students, parents and carers, and any other member of the local area who showed an active interest in the well-being of the town.

== Leadership ==
The school operates two separate Student Leadership Team systems, one for the VIth Form exclusively (The VIth Form Committee), and a Student Voice, representing the school as a whole. The two work together in many aspects of their duties that crossover between the Sixth Form and main school.

The VIth Form committee is led by a team of four students, all of which gain membership of the 'Student Voice'.

The 'Student Voice' is led by the student body, with an elected Chairperson, Vice Chairperson, Secretary and Treasurer.

Each Form Group elects two representatives, one of each gender. They then represent their form on a Year Council. Each Year Council in turn votes in two representatives for the Whole School Council, or the 'Student Voice'.

Full councils meet on a fortnightly basis and discuss a range of subjects from the uniform to use of the school budget. They also hold representation on various local bodies such as the Cornwall Youth Forum and the CPR Regeneration Forum. To date two students have been members of the United Kingdom Youth Parliament, representing the West Cornwall constituency.

== Controversies ==
Camborne Internal School and Science Academy has received criticism from local and national news outlets regarding its strict punishments for "minor" wrongdoings. Alleged incidents include a child punished for 'yawning' and pupils receiving detentions for taking off a blazer during the June 2023 heatwave (the UK experienced its warmest June since records began in 1884) and not having a clear pencil case, according to parents. The school as also been accused of falsifying documents and lying to parents about joining the Athena Learning Trust. In July 2026, The Athena Learning Trust announced that it was working with the Department for Education to identify alternative trusts to their schools could be transfer to. This follows the announcement in May that Athena's CEO, Ben Parnell, would be stepping down.

== Notable former pupils ==
- Brendon James, drummer of Thirteen Senses
- Josh Matavesi, rugby player, Ospreys (rugby union) and Fiji national rugby union team
- Tom Welham, lead guitarist of Thirteen Senses
- Lewis Goldsworthy, cricketer
- Joanna Thomas, professional bodybuilder
