= Gyeonggi Science High School =

High school in Suwon, South Korea

Coordinates: 37°18′32″N 127°00′23″E

- Hangul: 경기과학고등학교
- Hanja: 京畿科學高等學校
- RR: Gyeonggi gwahak godeunghakgyo
- MR: Kyŏnggi kwahak kodŭnghakkyo

Gyeonggi Science High School for the Gifted
- Suwon; South Korea

Information
- Type: Science Academy for the Gifted (Science High School for the Gifted)
- Motto: Patriotism, Creativity, Cooperation
- Established: 1983
- President: Kim Hyuk
- Faculty: 144
- Enrollment: 379
- Campus: 135 Suil-ro, Songjuk-dong, Jangan-gu, Suwon, Gyeonggi-do, South Korea
- Website: gs.hs.kr

Gyeonggi Science High School for the Gifted (GSHS, Korean: 경기과학고등학교), established in 1983 originally as a Science High school, is currently a science High school for the gifted in Suwon, South Korea. It was the first science high school established in South Korea, and was transformed into a science high school for the gifted, being one of the four in South Korea. It is the third been transformed from science high school to science high school for the gifted according to Gifted Education Promotion Law (Korean: 영재교육진흥법).

The symbol of Gyeonggi Science High School

== Motto ==
- Patriotism (Korean: 애국, Hanja: 愛國)
- Creativity (Korean: 창조, Hanja: 創造)
- Cooperation (Korean: 협동, Hanja: 協同)

== History ==
- November 19, 1981: Draft for establishment of a Science High School confirmed by Gyeonggi-do Education Committee.
- May 15, 1982: Start of construction.
- July 15, 1983: Official School Inception.
- May 5, 1983: The first entrance ceremony (2 class, 60 boy students)
- February 10, 1984: Official visit by President Chun Doo-hwan.
- February 1, 1986: The first graduation (graduation 54, completed 44)
- February 3, 1987: Designated as a Specialty High School.
- March 2, 1988: Began accepting girls and enrolled its first coeducational class.
- September 1, 1988: The second principal, Kang Sung-gi appointed.
- June 9, 1993: Official visit by President Kim Young-sam.
- March 2, 1994: The third principal, Lee Seok-geun appointed.
- March 1, 1999: The fourth principal, Kim Jong-oh appointed.
- December 19, 2008: Officially designated as "Science Academy" by Ministry of Education, Science and Technology.
- September 1, 2007: The sixth principal, Bu Seong-chan appointed.
- March 1, 2010: Officially named "Science Academy for the Gifted".
- March 2, 2010: The seventh, and current principal, Cheon Yeong-ho appointed.
- July 2, 2010: Officially announced transition to "Science Academy for the Gifted".
- January 22, 2011: Concluded MOU with South Carolina Governor's School for Science and Mathematics.
- August 3, 2011: Akira Suzuki (chemist), a Nobel Prize Laureate (2010), visited the school.
- November 12, 2011: Concluded MOU with GIST.
- February 21, 2012: Concluded MOU with UNIST.
- February 1, 2013: The first Graduation after modified to “Science Academy for the Gifted”.

== Admission policy ==
Admission procedure consists of 4 steps. In the first stage of admission, student documents including an introduction, a recommendation, and a document demonstrating the student's potential. All applicants are accepted at this stage. At the second stage, students are tested to judge if he or she really are gifted. 2000 students are accepted here. At the third and final stage, they are either accepted or attend a camp. About 120 students are finally accepted.

== Curriculum ==
It is consist of 139 credits of academic courses and 33 credits of research activities.

- Academic courses (139)
  - General courses include 26 credits of necessary courses and 32 credits of selective courses.(58)
  - 4 credits of liberal arts.(4)
  - Specialized courses include necessary course of 46 credits and selective courses of 31 credits.(77)
- Research activities (33)
  - Self-directed Research(R&E) : 20 credits
  - Field research : 8 credits
  - Research for graduation : 5 credits

There are PT system, seasonal school system, and AP with various universities, such as KAIST, POSTECH, GIST, UNIST by MOU.

== Graduation policy ==
To graduate from this school successfully, you have to fill in 4 criteria.

- Complete at least 172 credits.
- Get a score at least 650 in TEPS.
- Attend to group and voluntary activity each at least of 120 hours.
- Submit an own thesis in English.

== See also ==
- Education for the scientifically gifted in Korea
