= Pangram (AI detector) =

Artificial intelligence content detection software

- Developer: Pangram Labs
- Release: October 2023; 3 years ago
- Type: Artificial intelligence content detection
- Website: www.pangram.com

Pangram is AI content detection software developed by Pangram Labs. Its text detector classifies passages as human-written, AI-assisted or AI-generated. The company released Pangram 4 in July 2026. It also provides an image detector.

Independent studies of earlier versions found low error rates, but also found that some AI-generated texts escaped detection when prompted to imitate human authors. For Pangram 4, the company reported a false positive rate of 0.0041%, approximately one in 24,000, on an English-language benchmark. Its use in education and publishing has prompted debate about whether detector results provide sufficient evidence of undisclosed AI use.

== History ==
Max Spero and Bradley Emi founded the company in Brooklyn in 2023 and launched the service as Checkfor.ai that October. Spero became chief executive officer and Emi chief technology officer. The company adopted the name Pangram Labs in April 2024. In June 2025, Reuters reported that the company had raised about US$4 million in seed funding in a round led by ScOp Venture Capital. Its customers included Quora and NewsGuard.

Pangram 3, released in December 2025, added classifications for lightly and moderately AI-assisted writing. In July 2026, the company raised $9 million in a funding round led by Menlo Ventures. Pangram 4, released on July 29, added more detailed classification of passages that combine human writing with AI-generated or AI-edited text. The company also released Pangram Image as a research preview that day.

The July funding round also included ScOp and Haystack Ventures. Pangram told The New York Times that its monthly user count had risen from 2,700 in June 2025 to 120,000 in June 2026, and that its annualized revenue had increased 35 times over that period.

== Operation ==
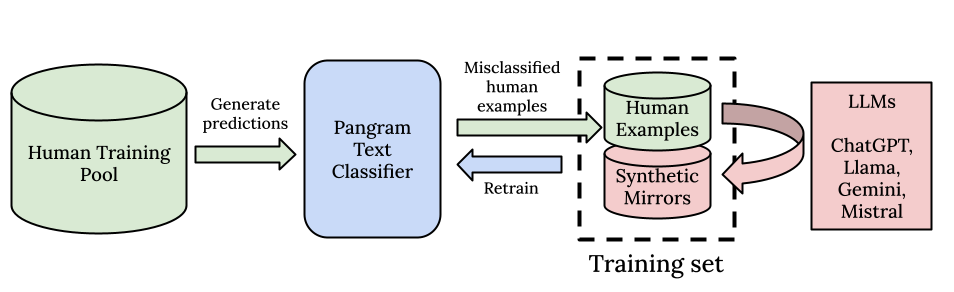
Pangram training process, using misclassified human examples and corresponding AI-generated texts to retrain the classifier.

Pangram Labs trains its detector on human writing paired with AI-generated texts matched by topic, length and tone. To reduce false positives, it identifies human texts the model has misclassified and adds them to the training data alongside corresponding AI examples. Pangram 4 uses a mixture of experts architecture to classify individual tokens, or units of text, then groups the results into labeled passages.

Pangram 4 analyzes prose of at least 50 words and reports how much and which parts of the text it classifies as human-written, AI-assisted or AI-generated. The company distinguishes its trained classifier from detection methods based on perplexity, which measure how predictable a text is to a language model. Its confidence labels do not give a calibrated probability that a classification is correct.

== Use ==
=== Services and integrations ===
Pangram is available on the company's website, through browser extensions and through an API. The browser extensions scan text as users browse. Pangram offers free access and paid subscriptions, with plagiarism checking as a separate feature. It integrates with Canvas and Google Classroom. In March 2026, NewsGuard introduced a tool using Pangram to identify websites with substantial amounts of AI-generated content. In July 2026, Substack added Pangram scans for readers to check posts and comments for AI-generated text.

=== Research applications ===
Pangram has also been used in research on the prevalence of AI-generated writing. A study co-authored by Pangram's founders and published at the 2026 Association for Computational Linguistics conference examined about 186,000 articles published by 1,500 American newspapers in summer 2025. Pangram flagged about 9% of the articles as partially or wholly AI-generated.

In a separate study, the company analyzed posts encountered by extension users who agreed to share their scan results. Pangram classified about 41% of the LinkedIn posts longer than 250 words in that sample as AI-generated. The sample covered LinkedIn, Medium, X, Reddit and Substack; Substack had the lowest combined share of AI-generated and AI-assisted long posts, at 21.9%.

Pangram Labs estimated that 21% of peer reviews submitted for the 2026 International Conference on Learning Representations were fully AI-generated. The American Association for Cancer Research used Pangram to examine submissions to its journals; it identified likely AI-generated text in 23% of abstracts and 5% of peer-review reports from 2024. A 2026 analysis for Organization Science used Pangram to examine submitted abstracts and peer reviews. The authors reported a decline after 2022 in the share of abstracts with low AI scores.

== Accuracy ==
=== Independent evaluations ===
A September 2025 National Bureau of Economic Research working paper by Brian Jabarian and Alex Imas compared Pangram with OriginalityAI, GPTZero and a detector based on RoBERTa. The authors reported near-zero false-positive and false-negative rates for Pangram across texts of different genres and lengths generated by different models, including text processed by humanizer software.

In a 2025 study, Jenna Russell, Marzena Karpinska and Mohit Iyyer compared automated detectors with people experienced in using language models for writing. When the participants' judgments were combined by majority vote, they correctly classified all but one of 300 English nonfiction articles. Pangram was the only automated detector tested to match that level of accuracy.

A 2025 study by Shoumik Saha and Soheil Feizi from the University of Maryland tested 12 detectors, including Pangram, on about 15,000 samples of human writing edited by AI. The detectors often classified minimally edited text as AI-generated and struggled to distinguish degrees of AI assistance. Text edited by older or smaller language models was more likely to be flagged.

A June 2026 study by Marijke Van Vlasselaer, Filip Van Droogenbroeck and Bram Spruyt at Vrije Universiteit Brussel compared Pangram, GPTZero, Copyleaks and Turnitin on 160 documents with known authorship. Pangram performed best at identifying fully AI-generated, mixed and humanized text; all four detectors classified the wholly human-written documents correctly under the study's scoring thresholds. The authors separately applied Pangram to 1,163 master's theses, for which the extent of AI use was unknown. They recommended investigating flagged work rather than relying on detector results alone.

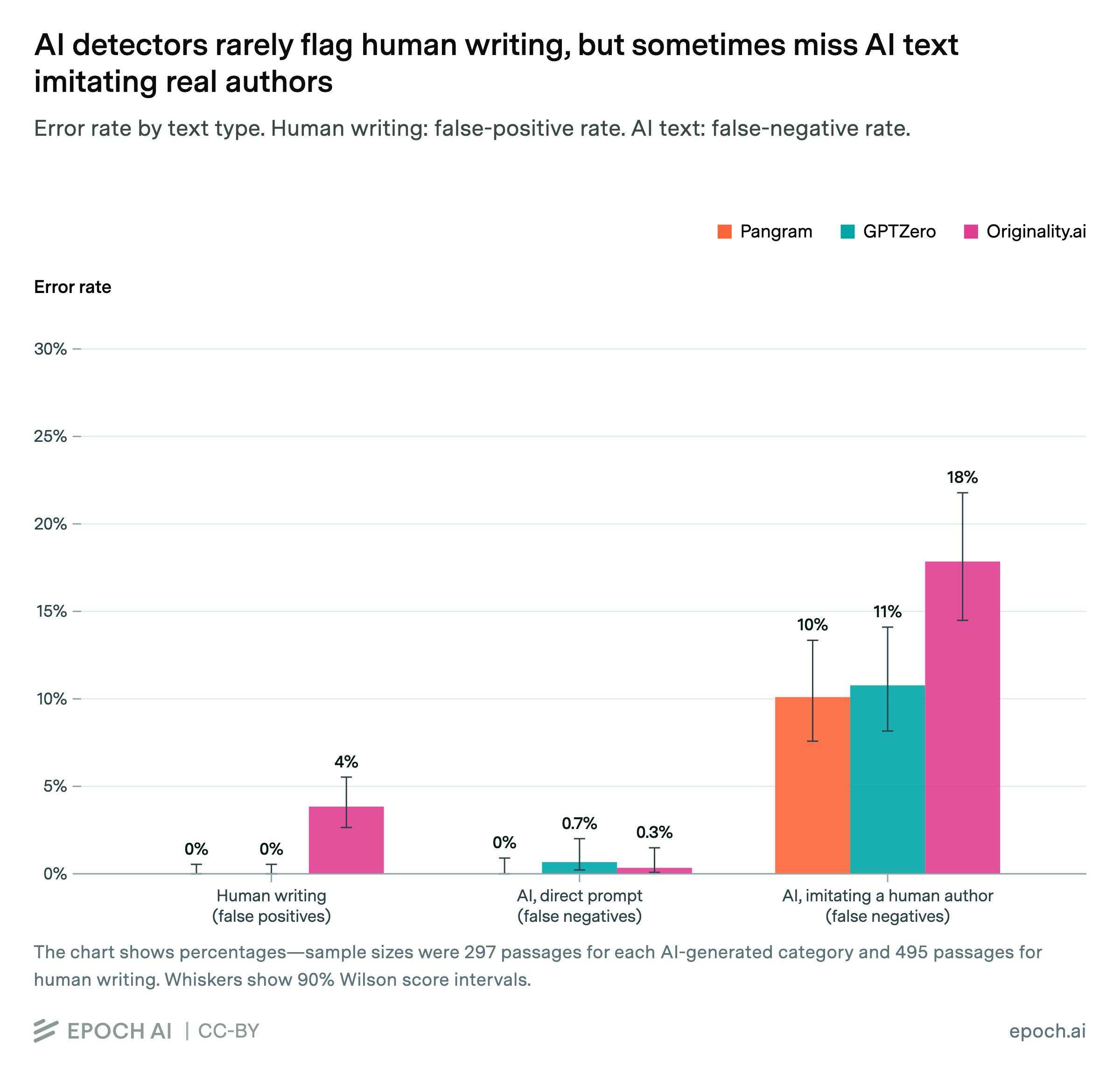
Error rates in an Epoch AI evaluation published in July 2026, before Pangram 4 was released. Pangram missed 10.1% of AI passages imitating human authors; the evaluation counted mixed classifications as missed detections.

In tests published on July 15, 2026, Epoch AI found that Pangram correctly classified all 495 human-written passages and all 297 AI passages generated from basic prompts. Pangram failed to classify 30 of 297 passages imitating particular human authors as fully AI-generated, a rate of 10.1%. The evaluation counted a "Mixed" verdict on wholly AI-generated text as a missed detection.

In July 2026, before the release of Pangram 4, the Reuters Institute for the Study of Journalism reported that Pangram had labeled 86% of 588 AI-generated samples compiled by researcher Alexios Mantzarlis as human-written. The samples used techniques such as rhyme, repetition and archaic language to evade detection.

An August 2026 paper by Jonathan A. Karr Jr. and colleagues at the University of Notre Dame tested Pangram 3.2 on academic abstracts. After the rewrites were processed with the humanizer Undetectable AI, Pangram missed more than 96% at the threshold used in the study. The authors cautioned against treating detector scores as sufficient evidence of academic misconduct.

=== Pangram 4 benchmarks ===
In tests by Pangram reported in July 2026, Pangram 4 incorrectly flagged 41 of 1,000,000 human-written English samples from FineWeb. This was a false-positive rate of 0.0041%, or approximately one in 24,000. The reported 95% confidence interval was 0.0032% to 0.0050%. The evaluation counted a "Mixed" classification of wholly human-written text as an error. The tests used the model's production settings.

In a separate test of 519,993 English texts generated by 26 AI models, the company reported a false negative rate of 0.3396% for Pangram 4, compared with about 1.99% for Pangram 3. The company also reported detecting AI involvement in 98.83% of samples processed by 13 commercial "humanizer" tools, which rewrite generated text to evade detection.

=== Limitations ===
Pangram 4 is designed for prose. According to the company, code, mathematical text, short factual answers and templated writing fall outside its intended use or are more prone to errors. The company also notes that a passage may receive a different classification when checked on its own than when checked as part of a longer document.

Pangram is in an "arms race" with the developers of large language models, which aim to produce more humanlike prose; the detector tends to perform worse on newer LLMs not included in its training set. It also performs worse when the LLM text has been fed into a "humanizer" program, when the AI was asked to imitate specific human authors, among other techniques.

Pangram also has historically struggled to accurately distinguish if a text is partly or wholly AI generated; for example, in a July 2026 test, author Freddie deBoer added several AI-generated sentences to his own writing, after which Pangram labeled the whole passage as AI-generated. Spero said Pangram 4 classified that example more accurately.

== Reception ==
In August 2026, Brian X. Chen of The New York Times reported that Pangram correctly distinguished human and generated writing in dozens of his tests, including attempts to imitate his style. He found the image detector less reliable.

Writing in The Atlantic in May 2026, Matteo Wong questioned reliance on Pangram in public accusations of AI use. He described a false positive involving Taylor Lorenz that Spero acknowledged after investigating. Spero claimed the false positive was due to the shortness of the 50-word excerpt. Wong also raised concerns about the black box nature of Pangram's algorithm; while Pangram can show what part of a text is likely to be generated by an LLM, it cannot describe why it was flagged.

After Pangram identified three of his writers' articles as AI-written, editor James Taranto of The Wall Street Journal called the tool a "defamation machine". Two of the authors admitted they used AI for revision of some of their work, which Taranto said is "inaccurate and unfair to characterize" as AI-generated.

In Slate, Tim Requarth argued that public accusations based on detectors focused too narrowly on whether the final prose was AI-generated, overlooking AI's influence on research and other stages of writing. Alex Kirshner said that AI detection tools have influenced him to consciously avoid writing "like AI".

In September 2026, Will Oremus reported disagreements among university instructors and administrators over Pangram and other detectors. Some instructors used detectors to investigate suspected AI writing; others questioned their reliability or redesigned assignments to reduce opportunities for undisclosed AI use.

=== Authorship disputes ===
According to a 2026 article in The Atlantic, "[b]asically every recent, high-profile accusation of someone passing off AI-generated writing as their own has started in the same way: with a tool called Pangram."

Pangram results contributed to the controversy over Mia Ballard's novel Shy Girl in March 2026. Spero said the detector classified 78% of the book as AI-generated. Ballard denied personally using AI and attributed any such use to an editor. Hachette discontinued the British edition and canceled its planned American publication.

Pangram also flagged a New York Times "Modern Love" essay by Kate Gilgan. Gilgan said she had used AI for "inspiration and guidance and correction" but had not copied generated prose into the essay.

In May 2026, Pangram results prompted allegations of AI use in stories by three regional winners of the Commonwealth Short Story Prize, published in Granta. The Commonwealth Foundation said shortlisted writers had denied using AI and upheld the results after further consultation. Granta's editor described the evidence as inconclusive. Some African writers challenged the accusations, questioning if there was bias or targeting applied against Black and African authors when investigating alleged AI usage.

Pangram was also used to question the authorship of passages in Pope Leo XIV's encyclical Magnifica humanitas, on "safeguarding the human person in the time of artificial intelligence". Snopes reported that one scan classified 4% of the encyclical as AI-generated and 2% as AI-assisted, but that the results did not establish whether AI had been used to write the document. Scans of earlier encyclicals returned wholly human-written classifications.

== See also ==
- AI slop
