= Artificial intelligence in education =

Artificial intelligence in education (often abbreviated as AIEd) is a subfield of educational technology that studies how to use artificial intelligence (AI) to create learning environments.

Considerations in the field include data-driven decision-making, AI ethics, data privacy, and AI literacy. Concerns include the potential for cheating, over-reliance, equity of access, reduced critical thinking, and the perpetuation of misinformation and bias.

== History ==
Efforts to integrate AI into educational contexts have often followed technological advancement in the history of artificial intelligence.

In the 1960s, educators and researchers began developing computer-based instruction systems, such as PLATO, developed by the University of Illinois.

In the 1970s, AI techniques were added to computer-assisted instruction (CAI) to form intelligent tutoring systems. The LISP Tutor was evaluated in a Carnegie Mellon University mini-course in the fall of 1984.

The International Artificial Intelligence in Education (AIED) Society was founded in 1993, and comprised researchers with backgrounds in computer science, education, and psychology. The International AIED Society also produces the International Journal of Artificial Intelligence in Education (IJAIED).

Coinciding with the AI boom of the 2020s, the use of large language models (LLMs) in the global north has been promoted and funded by venture capital and big tech. Companies creating AI services have targeted students and educational institutions as customers. Similarly, pre-AI boom educational companies have expanded their use of AI technologies. These commercial incentives for AIEd use may be related to a potential AI bubble. In the U.S., bipartisan support of AI development in K-12 education has been expressed, but specific implementations and best practices remain contentious.

== Platforms ==
Chatbots include OpenAI's ChatGPT, Anthropic's Claude, and Google's Gemini.

=== ChatGPT ===
ChatGPT was released by OpenAI in November 2022, and its adoption in education was rapid. However, the tool was banned by several institutions. Students have generally reported positive perceptions, but specific views from educators and students vary widely. Opinions are especially varied on what constitutes appropriate use of ChatGPT in education. Efforts to ban chatbots like ChatGPT in schools focus on preventing cheating, but enforcement is hampered due to AI detection inaccuracies and widespread accessibility of chatbot technology. Educators have also expressed concern that overreliance on the tool may foster superficial learning habits, erode critical thinking, and propagate misinformation. Some educators have proposed ways to integrate generative AI (GenAI) into assessments.

=== Claude ===
Claude is a series of LLMs developed by Anthropic. Its AI-based chatbot was released in March 2023.

In July 2026, Anthropic launched a version of Claude for teachers. Colleges and universities that offer "Claude for Education" include Columbia University, Stanford University, and others.

=== Gemini ===
Gemini is a GenAI chatbot and virtual assistant that was developed by Google in December 2023.

In August 2024, Google launched Gemini Gems, a customizable version of the tool, for educators. It was added to "Google Workspace for Education" accounts in March 2025.

In August 2026, Google added Gemini to its Classroom app for select schools at the elementary through high school level.

== Theory ==
AIEd applies theory from education studies, machine learning, and related fields.

A 2019 review of the previous decade of studies found that most research prioritized technological design over pedagogical integration.

Ouyang and Jiao (2021) propose three paradigms for AI in education, which follow roughly from least to most learner-centered and from requiring least to most technical complexity from the AI systems:

- AI-directed, learner-as-recipient: AIEd systems present a pre-set curriculum based on statistical patterns that do not adjust to learner's feedback.
- AI-supported, learner-as-collaborator: Systems that incorporate responsiveness to learner's feedback through, for example, natural language processing, wherein AI can support knowledge construction.
- AI-empowered, learner-as-leader: This model seeks to position AI as a supplement to human intelligence wherein learners take agency and AI provides consistent and actionable feedback.

Some scholars place AI in education within a socio-technical framework. This positions AI alongside other emerging educational technologies, such as computing, the internet, and social media.

The framework of Tsao, Heinrichs and Camit (2025) draws on new materialism and posthumanism, specifically Donna Haraway's concept of sympoiesis (making-with). This perspective views learning as an entanglement of human and non-human actors (students, teachers, and AI algorithms), where knowledge is co-composed in contact zones between human context and algorithmic prediction.

AI agents have been trained on biased datasets and thus continue to perpetuate societal biases. Since LLMs were created to produce human-like text, algorithmic bias can be introduced and reproduced. AI's data processing and monitoring reinforce neoliberal approaches to education rather than addressing inequalities.

== Applications ==
=== Educators ===
Uses of generative AI chatbots in education have included assessment and feedback, machine translations, proof-reading exam question generation and copy editing, or as virtual assistants. A 2025 survey of over 1,800 higher education employees estimated that around 40% of administrators and 30% of instructors use generative AI daily or weekly (up from 2% and 4% respectively in the spring of 2023).

Emotional AI in education is the study and development of systems that can detect learners' emotions or provide emotional support in learning.

Broad and unplanned use of AI in education administration may lead to harms such as discrimination through superficial categorization of student records, biases in automated grading toward students whose work fits preplanned algorithmic definitions, and exclusion of students from AI training whose previous experiences have not prepared them with requisite computer literacies. However, more structured uses have successfully incorporated generative AI into inquiry-based workflows in which University students use AI for exploration and critique while independently verifying claims against scholarly sources and incorporating expert feedback.

=== Students ===
A global survey from 2024 found that students primarily use generative AI for brainstorming, summarization, and research assistance, finding it effective for simplifying complex information but less reliable for factual accuracy and classroom learning. While students recognized its potential to enhance AI literacy and digital communication, professors highlighted significant limitations in critical thinking, interpersonal communication, and decision-making skills. In a global study, approximately 58% of students reported finding the AI tool useful in their daily lives. According to the survey, ChatGPT was particularly beneficial in blended learning environments where a significant portion of learning is conducted online. The majority of students expressed a preference for in-person assistance over AI, describing ChatGPT as a resource for when in-person support was unavailable.

Proponents of using chatbots in education argue for using it to enhance learning outcomes through personalized approaches. In testing this, a 2025 study at Harvard University found that students interacting with a specially-designed AI chatbot "learn significantly more in less time" than students participating in an active learning class.

AI chatbots have been used to attempt to improve literacy skills among adolescents and adults learning English as a second language. Chatbots provide feedback on writing and can help improve grammar and vocabulary. These tools can also support students with disabilities, such as dyslexia, by assisting with spelling and grammar. ChatGPT has the potential to automate routine tasks, enabling students to focus on conceptual work. However, the chatbot perpetuates biases in its training data, and OpenAI uses students' data to train upcoming models.

Technology writer Dan Gillmor used ChatGPT in 2022 on a student assignment, and found its generated text was on par with what a good student would deliver and opined that "academia has some very serious issues to confront".

Geography professor Terence Day assessed in 2023 citations generated by ChatGPT and found them to be fake. Despite this, he writes that "the titles of the fake articles are all directly relevant to the questions and could potentially make excellent papers. The lack of a genuine citation could signal an opportunity for an enterprising author to fill a void." According to Day, it is possible to generate high-quality introductory college courses using ChatGPT; he used it to write materials for "introductory physical geography courses, my second-year course in geographical hydrology, and second-year cartography, geographic information systems, and remote sensing." He concludes that "this approach could have significant relevance for open learning and could potentially affect current textbook publishing models." ChatGPT was also seen as an opportunity for cheap and individualized tutoring, leading to the creation of specialized chatbots like Khanmigo.

=== Interactive textbooks and courseware ===
Artificial intelligence has been incorporated into digital textbooks and other digital learning platforms to create more interactive and personalized learning environments. Such systems can combine traditional textbook content with AI tutoring, adaptive exercises, interactive diagrams and simulations, immediate feedback, and tools for students to answer questions or otherwise interact with course material.

Examples include CK-12's FlexBooks 2.0, which integrate interactive lessons, simulations, adaptive practice and the Flexi AI tutor, and Pearson eTextbooks, which provide interactive diagrams, quizzes, note-taking and AI-generated explanations, summaries and practice questions. In 2025, Google Research introduced Learn Your Way, an experimental system that uses generative artificial intelligence to transform textbook material into personalized explanations and alternative representations while retaining the source material.

== Usage ==
=== Schools and educators ===
Following the release of ChatGPT in November 2022, some schools and large school districts blocked access to the site and issued warnings that the use of such tools would be seen as cheating.

Governmental and non-governmental organizations such as UNESCO, Article 4 of the European Union's AI Act, and the U.S. Department of Education have published reports advocating for specific AIEd approaches. National higher-education bodies have also published guidance on generative AI, including Ireland's Higher Education Authority, which issued a policy framework for higher education teaching and learning in December 2025. In 2024, UNESCO released updated global guidance for generative AI in education, emphasizing ethical use, teacher training, and data protection to ensure responsible integration of AI tools in learning environments. According to Taso (2025), policy implementation in higher education is interpreted and enacted differently by various organizations. These decentralized policies can lead to inconsistent enforcement and confusion among students regarding what constitutes acceptable use, with the burden of ethical navigation falling on individual teachers and students.

AI integration in classrooms has created new forms of invisible labour for educators, who must navigate ambiguous policies, redesign assessments to be AI-resilient, and adjudicate potential academic integrity violations. The use of AI detection tools has also been criticised for creating an adversarial relationship between students and institutions, where students may be falsely accused of misconduct based on probabilistic software.

AIEd advocates say that efforts should be made toward increasing global accessibility and training educators to serve underprivileged areas.

In 2025, survey responses published by College Board showed that about two in five schools or school districts prohibited students' use of GenAI tools. However, 55% of high school principals reported that neither students nor educators had been blocked from accessing these tools on school networks.

According to NPR in a poll conducted with Ipsos in 2026, of 545 K-12 educators in the US, "nearly 3-in-4 believe AI has bigger implications for education than past innovations like the internet or computers." Around half of educators said they had used AI for work tasks. More than half said that students did not use AI in the classroom at all. Around half said it interfered with students ability to learn critical thinking skills, and that it was a shortcut for students to avoid work. Almost 80% of respondents said that schools should include teaching responsible AI usage as part of their curricula.

==== Adoption into assignments ====
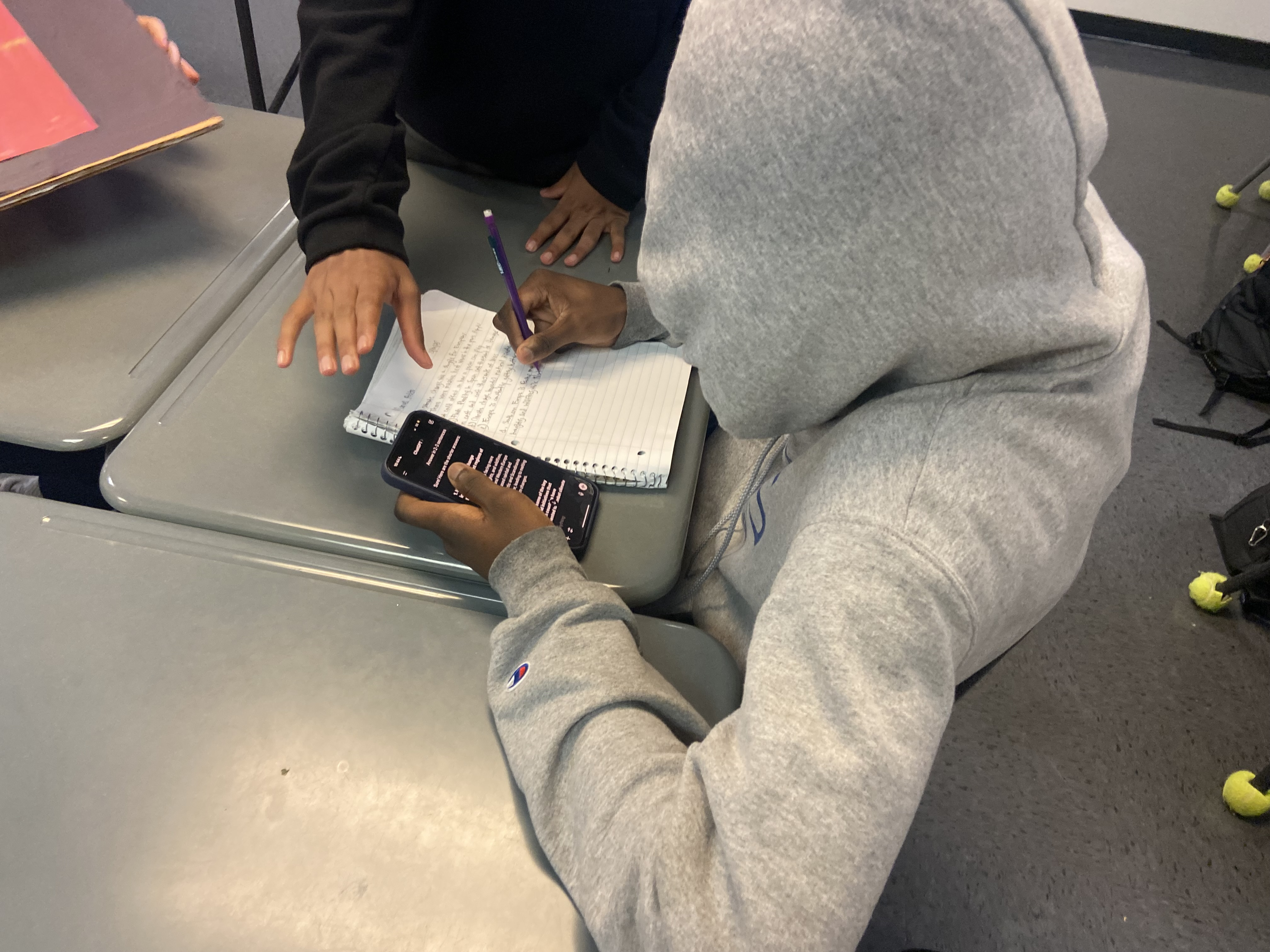
A student uses ChatGPT to complete one of his assignments

Andrew Maynard of Arizona State University, and Jules White of Vanderbilt University, both futures studies professors, have developed university courses specifically for prompt engineering generative AI chatbots. Although many schools have banned the use of ChatGPT, some professors have instead incorporated ChatGPT into assignments, saying that it is not feasible or practical to ban students from using it. One said that ChatGPT improved his students' work by assisting in the generation of ideas.

=== Students ===
Reliance on generative AI has been linked with reduced academic self-esteem and performance, and heightened learned helplessness. Algorithm errors and hallucinations are common flaws in AI agents, making them less trustworthy and reliable.

According to a 2025 survey from Inside Higher Ed, 85% of higher education students use generative AI technology in some way, with 25% using AI to complete assignments for them. The most common reason cited for using AI to cheat was pressure to get high grades. 97% of students wanted some form of action from schools on the threat to academic integrity caused by AI, with the most popular options being clearer policies and more education about ethical uses of AI.

Survey responses published by College Board showed that the number of high school students using GenAI tools for schoolwork had increased from 79% in January 2025 to 84% in May 2025.

In September 2025, The Atlantic published an op-ed from a high school senior arguing that the normalization of AI cheating was eroding critical thinking, academic integrity, creativity, and the shared student experience.

According to a 2026 study by Lumina Foundation-Gallup, 57% of U.S. college students reported using AI for coursework on a weekly basis, with about one in five using it on a daily basis.

=== In elementary education ===
The use of AI in schools is constantly changing for students and educators. While some students have been using it to complete assignments, teachers have been taking advantage of this technology to enhance their teaching lessons, better engage with students and personalize assignments, especially in early elementary school (K-5), where the relationship between student and teacher is fundamental.

==== Applications for teachers instructional aid ====
Teachers have been utilizing AI to aid instruction in schools, but they still consider the human connection the most important factor when using AI as a tool.

AI can be used as a helper and thought partner. Some educators use it to co-create lesson plans, analyze students' individualized education goals and personalize their education to meet defined goals and skill standards outlined by the district. It can assist on building transferable skills needed for socializing, expanding their vocabulary and writing. A teacher said that human oversight is needed and that she avoids giving unsupervised access to AI.

==== Student tools ====
Some educators are also encouraging students to generate their own ideas first before turning to technology. They ask students to reflect on the book or assignment, and then utilize AI by feeding their thoughts and build on that, rather than having the AI agent do all the thinking.

==== Risks ====
If students are not properly supervised when utilizing technology and AI, it can hinder key critical thinking and deep reading habits that are the core of early development.

== Impact ==
Daniel Herman's perspective reflects concerns about the potential devaluation of writing skills if AI can generate text as easily as humans. Similarly, Naomi S. Baron wrote "If AI text generation does our writing for us, we diminish opportunities to think out problems for ourselves". She also mentioned the risk of a slippery slope, where students start letting generative AI control the content and style of their writing, leading to a diminished sense of ownership. Others highlight the need for educators to adapt their methods to focus more on critical thinking and reasoning, as AI tools like ChatGPT could potentially be used for plagiarism or produce biased content.

ChatGPT, like other LLM-based chatbots, can produce plausible-sounding falsehoods, a concept sometimes referred to as hallucination.

Students' over-reliance on ChatGPT may impact their cognitive offloading and memory retention.

A 2026 University of Edinburgh study analyzing 26 education subreddits found that disputes over AI-assisted cheating and detection dominate GenAI-related discussions, drawing long, heated debates between students and teachers, creating friction between the two groups.

=== Academic integrity ===
ChatGPT's capability to generate assignments has prompted concerns about academic integrity, particularly in essay writing, with critics foreseeing potential misuse and devaluation of traditional writing skills. A survey conducted between March and April 2023 revealed 58% of American students acknowledged using ChatGPT, with 38% admitting use without teacher consent, highlighting challenges in enforcing bans. Students have shown strongly differing opinions on the extent to which the use of ChatGPT should be viewed as misconduct. Kevin Roose stated that ChatGPT's prohibition was impractical to enforce. Students can access the internet outside of schools, effectively rendering a ban obsolete; he further suggested that teachers allow it openly for some assignments similar to calculators, and that teaching with the AI is the best approach.

A professor at Texas A&M University misused ChatGPT to check student assignments for verifying whether an assignment utilized the large language model. ChatGPT claimed all the students used it, and so the professor gave a failing grade to all of his students. In fact, ChatGPT is unable to reliably verify whether it was used to write a piece of text. A post to a Reddit community dedicated to ChatGPT received widespread attention with many attacking the professor for a lack of familiarity towards the chatbot.

Universities have stated serious concerns with the integrity of their curriculum due to students using ChatGPT and other AI tools. Baylor University asked students to submit handwritten essays in order to uphold academic integrity. The oral exam has also been used as an example of an instruction method which could circumvent the assignment and test students' knowledge more effectively on a 1:1 basis.

Four days before South Korea's 2026 College Scholastic Ability Test, a scandal erupted when it was revealed that a near-perfect score in that nation's tax accountant examination had been achieved using electronic devices and AI. This lead to draconian measures being rushed through and the resignation of the Education Minister for the belated response.

=== Business ===
OpenAI launched "ChatGPT Edu" in May 2024.

The education technology company Chegg, which was a website dedicated to helping students with assignments using a database of collected worksheets and assignments, became one of the most prominent business victims to ChatGPT, with its stock price nearly being cut in half after a quarterly earnings call in May 2023.

== Bans ==
Some educational institutions have chosen to ban access to generate AI. The reasons behind these decisions likely vary, but concerns about potential misuse, such as plagiarism or reliance on AI for writing tasks, could be driving factors. ChatGPT has been met with various bans from certain educational institutions. One of the earliest districts to ban the tool was the Los Angeles Unified School District, which blocked access to the tool less than a month after its official release. The New York City Department of Education blocked access to ChatGPT announced a ban around January 4, 2023.

In February 2023, the University of Hong Kong sent a campus-wide email to instructors and students stating that the use of ChatGPT or other AI tools is prohibited in all classes, assignments and assessments at the university. Any violations would be treated as plagiarism by the university unless the student obtains the prior written consent from the course instructor.

=== Repeals ===
Some schools in the United States for the 2023–24 school year announced a repeal of their bans for ChatGPT. In May 2023, New York City repealed its ban on ChatGPT. Davis Banks, the head of New York City's public schools at the time, explained that the initial decision to ban the tool was driven by a "knee-jerk fear [that] overlooked the potential of generative AI to support students and teachers". He also recognized that AI would inevitably be a part of students' future workplaces and argued that teaching them to use it ethically would be more beneficial than imposing a blanket ban. With the ban lifted, educators in New York City now have the opportunity to use ChatGPT for various educational purposes, including teaching about AI prejudice and creating lessons. To assist in this transition, the city's Department of Education committed to providing educators with "resources, real-life examples of successful AI implementation in schools, and an AI toolkit".

Another district, Walla Walla Public Schools, located in rural Washington, also lifted its ban on ChatGPT starting in the 2023–24 school year. To support this transition, the district hosted a daylong workshop that focused on the positive learning benefits of AI in the classroom. The event was attended by around 100 local educators.

== Detection software ==
Some companies provide software which purports to detect the use of AI in essays. Among the first companies to develop such a service was Turnitin. A corporate blog post from the company stated that the company's database of numerous student essays was used to train its own detection system. When tested by The Washington Post, it was noted that Turnitin's detector flagged an innocent student for using ChatGPT to generate the conclusion of her essay. There have been numerous other cases similar to this in which a student is falsely accused of using AI and report not knowing how to prove their innocence.

Other similar detection tools include GPTZero. Detection software often fails to detect content generated by AI, and such tools are easy to fool. Tools such as AI humanizers, which aim to make AI-generated text appear more human-like, help to trick AI detectors. OpenAI's official AI detection tool, Classifier, launched in January 2023, and was later taken down in August 2023 due to low usage and accuracy issues.

To combat false accusations of academic dishonesty, AI detection creators and educators recommend not relying solely on these tools.

== See also ==
- Computational education
- Computing education
- Computers in the classroom
- Digital divide
- Educational technology
- List of chatbots
- List of free educational software
- List of online educational resources
