= Hamed Haddadi (computer scientist) =

British computer scientist

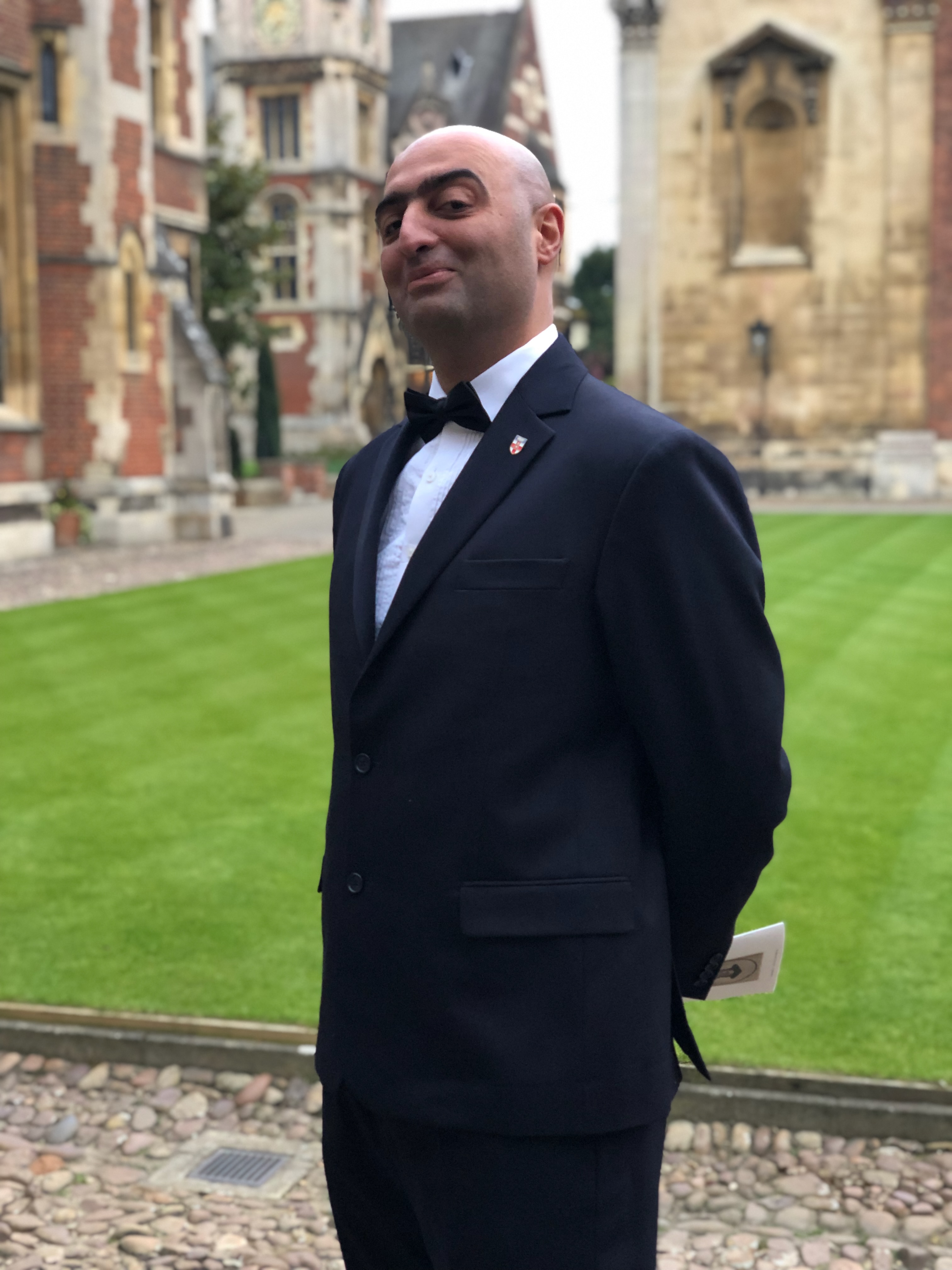
- Hamed Haddadi
- Born: March 1981 (age 45)
- Citizenship: British, Iranian
- Education: University College London (BEng); University College London (MSc); University College London (PhD)
- Scientific career
- Fields: Computer Networks; Mobile Computing; Privacy; Security
- Workplaces: Imperial College London; Brave Software
- Thesis: discovery.ucl.ac.uk/id/eprint/14222 (2008)
- Doctoral advisor: Andrew W. Moore, Miguel Rio, Richard Mortier
- Website: https://www.imperial.ac.uk/people/h.haddadi

Hamed Haddadi (Persian: حامد حدادی, Persian pronunciation: [hɑmɛd hæddɑdi]) is the Professor of Human-Centred Systems at the Department of Computing in Imperial College London, a Fellow of UKRI, and the Chief Scientist at Brave Software, leading the Brave research team. He is known for establishing the field of Human-Data Interaction, a sub-field of HCI concerned with the issue of increasingly pervasive data collection and how this is opaque to end users of digital systems. He began the HDI Network, with subsequent adoption by BBC R&D for developing technologies that support digital rights in relation to personal data.

== Education ==
Haddadi graduated from University College London with a BEng in 2003 and his PhD in 2008 for research into Internet topology and routing protocols supervised by Miguel Rio, Andrew Moore, and Richard Mortier.

During his undergraduate studies, Haddadi spent two summers at Sony Semiconductors working on ARM processor cores licensed by ARM Limited for Sony devices. During his PhD, he spent time working at Intel Research in Cambridge and the University of Adelaide.

== Research and teaching ==
Haddadi is an editor of Privacy by Design for the Internet of Things published in 2021 by the Institution of Engineering and Technology. The book draws on interdisciplinary research to delineate the challenges of building accountability into the Internet of Things and explores solutions for improving the state-of-the-art ranging from distributed data analytics to accountability and data protection by design.

At Imperial College London, Hamed teaches at the Department of Computing as well as the MSc in Security and Resilience course in the Institute for Security Science and Technology as a Security Science Fellow.

During his time as a postdoctoral researcher, Haddadi worked with the CHDI Foundation on a sheep model of Huntington's Disease, leading to the discovery of leadership and selfishness in sheep flocks.

Haddadi primarily researches privacy, security, and computer networking. In 2010, he co-authored one of the earliest measurements of user influence in the Twitter social network and subsequently metrics for information flow through these networks. In 2013, Haddadi co-authored the open source ACM SIGCOMM eBook on Recent Advances in Networking. In 2015 he established the Human-Data Interaction interest group.

Since 2021, Haddadi has been the Chief Scientist of Brave after a period there as a visiting professor. He publishes papers on the privacy risks of search engine advertising and new approaches to preventing tracking in web browsers. He also has been investigating the use of federated learning as an alternative to the advertising-driven economy.

In 2025, Haddadi delivered his inaugural lecture at Imperial College, where he discussed his academic journey in networking and computer systems.

== See also ==
- Cha Meeyoung
- Pablo Rodriguez
