= Bongeui Middle School =

Middle school in Gangwon, South Korea

- 봉의중학교

Location
- 55 Chuncheon-ro 296beon-gil, Chuncheon, Gangwon; South Korea; 37.8778°N 127.7438°E

Information
- Type: Public
- Opened: 1972
- Principal: Baek Seon-ok
- Staff: 61 (2025)
- Enrollment: 484 (2025)
- Endowment: Gangwon State Chuncheon Office of Education
- Website: byms.gwe.ms.kr/main.do

- Bongeui Middle School
- Hangul: 봉의중학교
- Hanja: 鳳儀中學校
- RR: Bongui junghakgyo
- MR: Pongŭi chunghakkyo

Bongeui Middle School (Korean: 봉의중학교) is a public middle school located in Chuncheon City, Gangwon, South Korea. Initially founded as Bongeui Girl's Middle School and name was changed to accept both genders in 2014. Their tree is the magnolia and the flower the rhododendron schlippenbachii.

== History ==
- December 27, 1971 – Established as Bongeui Girl's Middle School
- March 3, 1972 – Entrance ceremony
- February 20, 1975 – First graduation ceremony
- March 1, 2014 – Name changed to Bongeui Middle School
- March 1, 2023 – Baek Seon-ok takes office as 17th principal

== Notable alumni ==
- Binnie, singer in Oh My Girl
- Cha Meeyoung, scientific director of the Max Planck Institute for Security and Privacy
- E-Young, singer in After School
- Park Bo-ram, soloist singer
