= Talkpal AI =

Online language learning platform

- Website type: Private
- Available in: List: English; Spanish; French; German; Italian; Japanese; Chinese; Korean; Arabic; Dutch; Portuguese; Swedish; Norwegian; Finnish
- Headquarters: Delaware, U.S.
- Founders: David Gegechkori, Dimitri Dekanozishvili
- Industry: E-learning, online education
- Website: talkpal.ai
- Registration: yes
- Launched: 2023; 3 years ago
- Current status: Online

Talkpal AI, operating as Talkpal, is an American company operating a freemium-based language learning app and e-learning platform with its headquarters in Wilmington, Delaware, U.S.

Talkpal's app is available for web, iOS and Android. It offers lessons in more than 57 languages, including English, Esperanto, German, French, Spanish, Italian, Japanese, Chinese, Korean, and Arabic. The company develops its learning content by a team of language experts and AI researchers.

== Background ==
Talkpal AI was developed beginning in 2023 by David Gegechkori and Dimitri Dekanozishvili, initially launching as a web application and later expanding to iOS and Android in 2023. The platform reportedly gained more than 500,000 users following its release in 2023. As of November 2025, it had over 6 million learners across 180 countries.

== Product ==
Talkpal provides text-based and voice-based interaction with an artificial intelligence tutor designed to simulate natural conversation. The platform supports over 57 languages, including major languages such as English, Spanish, French, German, Italian, Portuguese, Japanese, Korean, Chinese, and Arabic, as well as numerous other languages.

== Business model ==
Talkpal operates on a freemium business model, offering a subscription-based service. The service provides a free basic tier with limited daily access, while additional features are available through paid plans.

The paid subscriptions come in monthly and multi-month or multi-year forms. The company also offers an enterprise version of its platform (sometimes referred to as "Talkpal Business"), specifically designed for companies and institutions. Enterprise plans are sold through multi-license packages, including 3-month licenses, reflecting tiered pricing based on license duration, and available for organizations to purchase subscriptions in bulk for multiple employees.

== Academic studies ==
Talkpal has been the subject of several academic studies examining its effectiveness in language education, particularly for English as a Second Language (ESL) and English as a Foreign Language (EFL) learners.

In 2024, A quantitative experimental study published by Efendi Hidayatullah in the Journal of Insan Mulia Education investigated Talkpal's impact on English speaking proficiency among university students. The research employed a pretest-posttest control group design with participants from varying English proficiency levels. The study found that students in the experimental group using Talkpal demonstrated statistically significant improvements in fluency and intelligibility compared to the control group.

An experimental study involving 100 students published in the journal Language, Technology, and Social Media by Dikaprio and Diem in 2024 evaluated Talkpal's effectiveness in enhancing English proficiency among second-semester English Education Study Program students in Indonesia.

A 2025 study published in Social Sciences & Humanities Open by Melissa Özlem Grab examined the integration of AI chatbots, including Talkpal, in ESL education. The twelve-week intervention study with 120 undergraduate students from diverse cultural backgrounds found that participants using AI chatbots demonstrated improvements across multiple areas including fluency, pronunciation, grammar, vocabulary, and speaking confidence compared to traditional instruction methods.

A 2025 literature review published in the International Journal of AI in Language Education by Nguyen Cam Van examined the use of Talkpal for enhancing speaking proficiency among Vietnamese adult learners. The study emphasized Talkpal's effectiveness in providing real-time feedback and personalized learning experiences.

== Reception ==
User reviews on platforms such as Trustpilot and app stores have been generally positive. The app maintains ratings of approximately 4.3 to 4.7 stars on app stores.

Common positive feedback includes appreciation for the pressure-free practice environment, real-time feedback capabilities, and flexibility in learning approaches. Users have particularly noted the value of conversation practice without requiring a human language partner.

== See also ==
- Language education
- Language-learning software
- Computer-assisted language learning
- Artificial intelligence in education
