= Marc Najork =

Distinguished Research Scientist at Google DeepMind

Marc-Alexander Najork
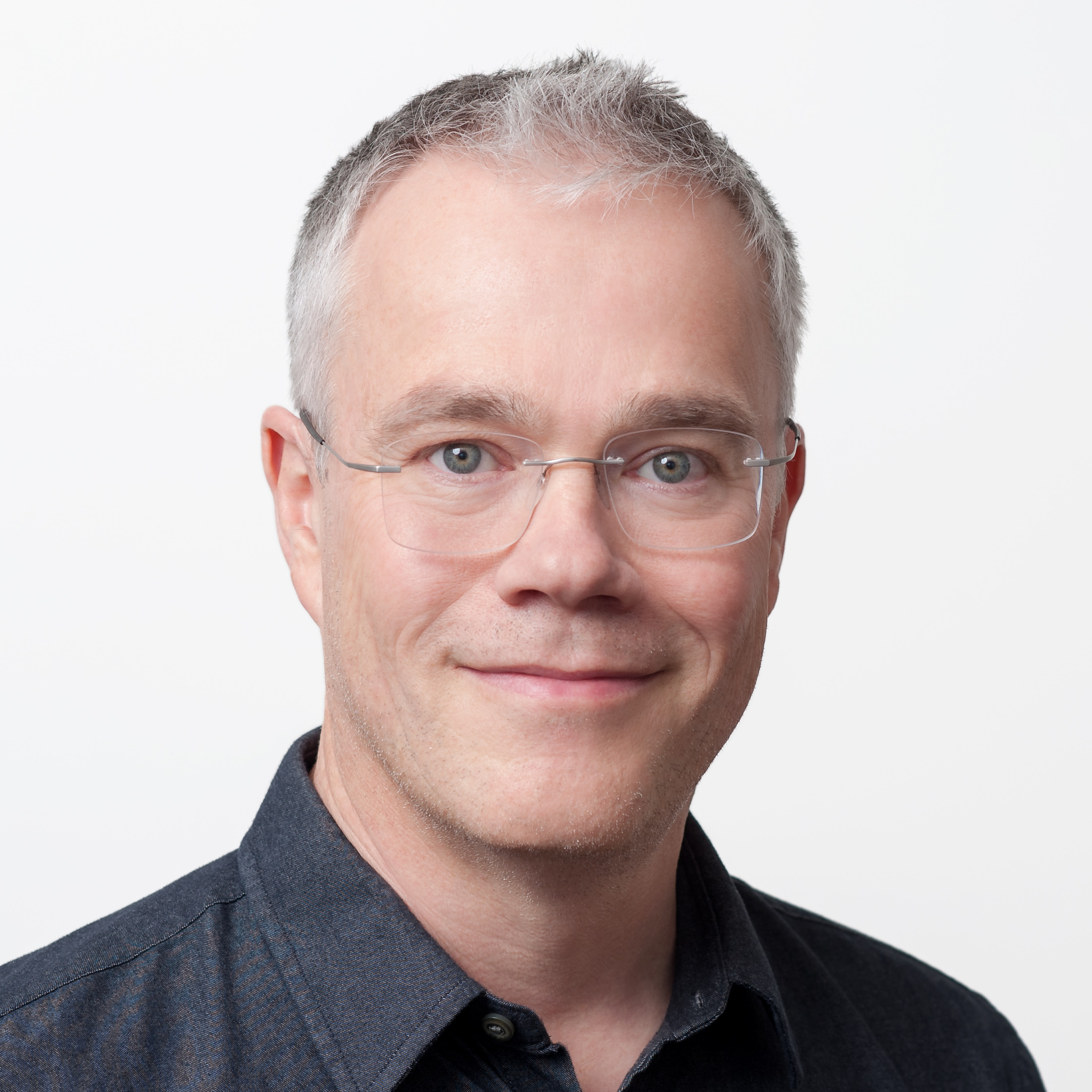
- Born: August 14, 1963; Frankfurt, Germany
- Education: Ph.D.
- Alma mater: University of Illinois Urbana-Champaign, Technische Universität Darmstadt
- Known for: Information retrieval, web search
- Scientific career
- Fields: Computer science
- Workplaces: Google DeepMind, Google Research, Microsoft Research Silicon Valley, Compaq, Digital Equipment Corporation
- Thesis: Programming in Three Dimensions (1994)
- Doctoral advisor: Simon M. Kaplan
- Website: https://marc.najork.org

Marc-Alexander Najork is a distinguished research scientist at Google DeepMind working on generative artificial intelligence. His career spans research at Google Research, Microsoft Research and DEC Systems Research Center on data retrieval, link-based ranking algorithms, detection of spam websites, a distributed web crawler, and a scripting system for 3D animations, among others. He has served in several leadership positions for publications and conferences of the Association for Computing Machinery. He has coauthored over a hundred research papers and holds over 40 US patents. He is an IEEE Fellow, ACM Fellow, AAAS Fellow, and AAIA Fellow.

== Education ==
Marc graduated with a diplom in wirtschaftsinformatik from Technische Universität Darmstadt in 1989. He completed his Ph.D. in computer science at University of Illinois Urbana-Champaign. Overseen by Simon M. Kaplan, his thesis was on Cube, "the first visual language to employ a three-dimensional syntax." The programming language was also supported by a grant from the National Science Foundation.

== Career ==
In 1993, Marc joined Digital Equipment Corporation which was later merged with Compaq. One of his contributions was to Mercator, an extendable, Java-based, high-performance web crawler which was integrated into AltaVista in 2001. Marc Najork and Marc Brown were the main contributors to JCAT, a Java-based algorithm animation system with classroom applications. Luca Cardelli developed Obliq, which Marc used to make Obliq-3D, a fast-turnaround 3D animation system.

In 2001, he joined Microsoft Research Silicon Valley. He contributed to Boxwood, a distributed, scalable B-tree which serves as a foundation for storage infrastructure. The creation of PageTurner, with Dennis Fetterly and Mark Manasse, was designed to study the evolution of webpages. They also found that past behavior of changes in websites was indicative of future changes on that site. Further study of the data showed that statistical anomalies were a good predictor of spam, which led Microsoft to file a patent later used by Microsoft Bing. Marc also developed the Scalable Hyperlink Store, which is a scalable, fault-tolerant, and incrementally updateable database for storing large portions of a webgraph in memory.

He joined the Personal Search Infrastructure team at Google in 2014 where he worked on HappyHour, a processing and serving system for structured personal data. He then became a senior director of research engineering at Google Research where he managed a team advancing the state of the art in information retrieval. Marc then became a distinguished research scientist at Google Deepmind where he works on generative artificial intelligence.

== Honors and fellowships ==
Marc was along the inaugural inductees of the ACM SIGIR Academy. He is also an IEEE Fellow, ACM Fellow, AAAS Fellow, and AAIA Fellow.

== Editorial boards and conferences ==
Marc served both as an associate editor and editor-in-chief of ACM Transactions on the Web, served as co-chair of the news section of the Communications of the ACM, and sits on the ACM Publications Board. He was conference chair of WSDM 2008 and program co-chair of WSDM 2025 with Cha Meeyoung and Marie-Francine Moens. In The Web Conference series, he was program co-chair of WWW 2004 and WWW 2021. Along with Yoelle Maarek, Marc is a co-chair of the SIGIR Academy 2025 Selection Committee. Marc will be co-chairs with Hannah Bast and Min Zhang for SIGIR 2026.

== Selected publications ==
- Ntoulas, Alexandros; Najork, Marc; Manasse, Mark; Fetterly, Dennis (23 May 2006). "Detecting spam web pages through content analysis". Proceedings of the 15th international conference on World Wide Web. pp. 83–92. doi:10.1145/1135777.1135794. ISBN 1-59593-323-9.
- Heydon, Allan; Najork, Marc (December 1999). "Mercator: A Scalable, Extensible Web Crawler". World Wide Web. 2 (4): 219–229. doi:10.1023/A:1019213109274.
- Fetterly, Dennis; Manasse, Mark; Najork, Marc; Wiener, Janet (20 May 2003). "A large-scale study of the evolution of web pages". Proceedings of the twelfth international conference on World Wide Web - WWW '03. pp. 669–678. doi:10.1145/775152.775246. ISBN 1-58113-680-3.
- Olston, Christopher; Najork, Marc (11 February 2010). "Web Crawling". Foundations and Trends in Information Retrieval. 4 (3): 175–246. doi:10.1561/1500000017 (inactive 15 March 2026).
- Najork, Marc; Wiener, Janet L. (1 April 2001). "Breadth-first crawling yields high-quality pages". Proceedings of the 10th international conference on World Wide Web. pp. 114–118. doi:10.1145/371920.371965. ISBN 1-58113-348-0.
- Wang, Xuanhui; Golbandi, Nadav; Bendersky, Michael; Metzler, Donald; Najork, Marc (2018). "Position Bias Estimation for Unbiased Learning to Rank in Personal Search". Proceedings of the Eleventh ACM International Conference on Web Search and Data Mining. pp. 610–618. doi:10.1145/3159652.3159732. ISBN 978-1-4503-5581-0.
- Metzler, Donald; Tay, Yi; Bahri, Dara; Najork, Marc (16 July 2021). "Rethinking Search: Making Domain Experts Out of Dilettantes". ACM SIGIR Forum. 55 (1): 1–27. arXiv:2105.02274. doi:10.1145/3476415.3476428.

== See also ==
- Andrei Broder
- Monika Henzinger
- Michael Mitzenmacher
- Krishna Bharat
- Héctor García-Molina
