= Undetectable.ai =

Online text analysis and obfuscation software

Undetectable AI
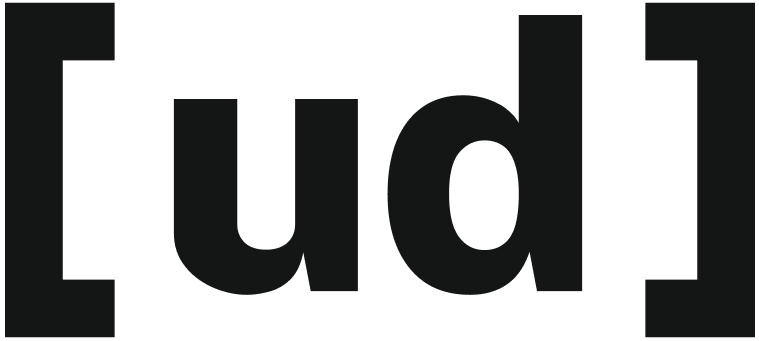
- Developers: Bars Juhasz; Christian Perry; Devan Leos
- Release: 1 May 2023; 3 years ago
- Written in: Python
- Platform: Cloud computing
- Website: undetectable.ai

Undetectable AI (alternatively Undetectable.ai) is an artificial intelligence content detection and modification software designed to identify and alter artificially generated text, such as that produced by large language models.

== History ==
Undetectable AI was developed by Bars Juhasz, a PhD student from Loughborough University, along with Christian Perry and Devan Leos. It was publicly released in May 2023.

== Reception and analysis ==
Several studies have examined Undetectable AI:

- In July 2023, researchers from Magna Græcia University tested Undetectable AI against generative-text and plagiarism detection software. They found that texts processed through the software were significantly harder to detect as AI-generated.
- In November 2023, Erik Piller of Nicholls State University published a paper examining the ethical implications of Undetectable AI in professional writing contexts.
- In August 2023, researchers led by Christoph Bartneck investigated how Undetectable AI might affect data quality in online questionnaires. They found that while AI detection systems could identify ChatGPT-generated text, they were less successful with text processed by Undetectable AI.
- In October 2025, journalist David Gewirtz tested Undetectable AI's content detector to see if it could accurately identify AI-generated text who stated "it rated human writing (Test 1) as 60% likely AI, and all three AI writing samples as 75%, 76%, and 77% likely human. Ah, well, I guess Undetectable is "humanizing" its results, insofar as it's living up to the phrase "to err is human.".

== See also ==
- GPTZero
- Turnitin
- Copyleaks
- Content similarity detection
