= Cha Meeyoung =

South Korean data scientist (born 1979)

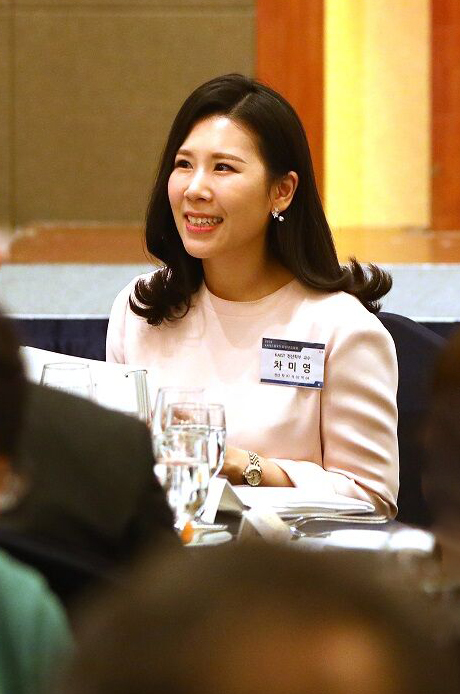
- Born: July 28, 1979 (age 47); Daejeon, South Korea
- Other name: Mia
- Education: KAIST
- Known for: Facts before Rumors research, Measuring User Influence in Twitter: The Million Follower Fallacy
- Awards: ACM Distinguished Member, Hong Jin-Ki Creator Award
- Scientific career
- Fields: Social computing, complex networks, data science, social networking services
- Workplaces: Max Planck Institute for Software Systems, KAIST, SK Telecom, Korea Internet Self-Governance Organization, Facebook, Institute for Basic Science, Max Planck Institute for Security and Privacy
- Theses: Resource-Constrained Low-Power Bus Encoding with Crosstalk Delay (2004); Network Support for Emerging Multimedia Streaming Services (2008)
- Doctoral advisors: Moon Sue (문수복)
- Other academic advisors: Kim Taewhan

Korean name
- Hangul: 차미영
- Hanja: 車美英
- RR: Cha Miyeong
- MR: Ch'a Miyŏng
- Website: Faculty Page at MPG

Cha Meeyoung (Korean: 차미영; born July 28, 1979), sometimes known as Mia, is a scientific director of the Max Planck Institute for Security and Privacy in Germany. Previous to Max Planck, she was an associate professor at Korea Advanced Institute of Science & Technology (KAIST) in the School of Computing and a chief investigator in the Pioneer Research Center for Mathematical and Computational Sciences at the Institute for Basic Science. Her research focuses on network and data science with an emphasis on modeling, analyzing complex information propagation processes, machine learning-based computational social science, and deep learning. She has served on the editorial boards of the journals PeerJ and ACM Transactions on Social Computing.

== Early life and education ==
Mia was born in Daejeon, South Korea. She had a "boring" childhood in Chuncheon, where she often spent time alone in her thoughts. Growing up, she often would play with the novelist O Jeonghui's daughter as they were the same age and lived in the same apartment complex.

She went to Bongeui Middle School and then was one of the only female students attending Kangwon Science High School at that time. The entirety of Meeyoung's higher education has taken place at the Korea Advanced Institute of Science and Technology (KAIST) in Daejeon, South Korea. She initially desired to major in astrophysics, as she grew up loving stars and was influenced by her physicist father, but KAIST had no degree in astrophysics. Majoring in computer science, she graduated magna cum laude for her B.S. Within the Graduate School for Culture Technology at KAIST, the adviser for her M.S. was Kim Taewhan, and her Ph.D. was supervised by Sue Moon.

Noting that IPTV was becoming more popular, but data packets had issues transversing networks, Mia initially focused her dissertation on a purely mathematical solution. Upon seeing the issue also involved various socio-demographic factors, she analyzed the viewing habits of IPTV users to optimize the distribution algorithm. She later stated in an interview, "It became clear to me that the combination of computer science and social science could change things for the better in society."

== Career ==
On October 24th, 2007, Cha Meeyoung published her most cited paper called "I tube, you tube, everybody tubes: analyzing the world's largest user generated content video system." This paper provided an in-depth study of YouTube and other user-generated video content. This paper received the ACM IMC Test of Time Award in 2022. About receiving the award she wrote "...was a deeply meaningful moment. It reminded us that research can have lasting relevance..."

In 2008, Cha Meeyoung worked as a postdoc in Max Planck Institute for Software Systems under adviser Krishna Gummadi. Leaving Max Planck, she returned to her alma mater and became an assistant professor in the Graduate School of Culture Technology later becoming an associate professor joint faculty member in the School of Computing. Outside of KAIST, she worked as a scientific and technical consultant for both SK Telecom and the Korea Internet Self-Governance Organization in 2010 and 2014, respectively.

In 2015, Cha Meeyoung went to Menlo Park to work as a visiting professor with Facebook's Data Science Team hosted by Lada Adamic. In 2019, she and Oum Sang-il were the founding chief investigators of the Pioneer Research Center for Mathematical and Computational Sciences at the Institute for Basic Science (IBS). This and the Pioneer Research Center for Biomolecular and Cellular Structure are the first of two such centers at IBS. Headed by Cha Meeyoung, the Data Science Group researches fake news, perception biases in relation to AI, deep learning of heterogeneous data for modeling human behavior, and prediction efforts through language processing and image analysis. Seeing the infodemic on COVID-19 information starting in China and spreading to Korea and the US, the Data Science Group and researchers from Ewha Womans University, started the multilingual Facts Before Rumors campaign to separate common claims seen online.

She has been named BACUDA science collaborator of the World Customs Organization; BACUDA stands for Band of Customs Data Analysts. Cha is a member of the Seoul Forum for International Affairs, and a commissioner for the Presidential Council on Intellectual Property, Open Data Mediation Committee, National Tax Service, Korea Customs Service, and Korea Copyright Commission.

In June 2024, Cha Meeyoung relocated to the Max Planck Institute for Security and Privacy in Bochum, Germany, to become a scientific director at the Max Planck Society heading the Data Science for Humanity research group. She is the first South Korea director and second Asian female scientist to hold such a position at Max Planck.

In addition to continuing some of her research interests started in Korea, Cha Meeyoung is doing more work as a scientific advisor, speaking at the German-Korean Forum in Dresden and the United Nations World Health Summit in October 2024, and also serving on an AI ethics committee for UN Secretary-General António Guterres.

== Awards and honors ==
- 2024: ACM Distinguished Member, Association for Computing Machinery (ACM)
- 2024: Hong Jin-Ki Creator Award
- 2022: Test of Time Award, Association for Computing Machinery SIGCOMM (ACM IMC)
- 2022: Commendation, 55th Science Day, Ministry of Science and ICT
- 2020: Test of Time Award, International AAAI Conference on Web and Social Media (AAAI ICWSM)
- 2019: Young Information Scientist Award, Korean Institute of Information Scientists and Engineers and IEEE-CS
- 2016: Lifetime member, Korean Institute of Information Scientists and Engineers
- 2012: Best Paper, International AAAI Conference on Web and Social Media (AAAI ICWSM)
- 2009: Best Data Workshop Paper, 3rd Int'l AAAI Conference on Weblogs and Social Media
- 2007: Best Paper, ACM Internet Measurement Conference

== Editorial boards and conferences ==
From 2016, Cha Meeyoung has served on the editorial boards of PeerJ and ACM Transactions on Social Computing. In 2025, she was program co-chair of WSDM with Marc Najork and Marie-Francine Moens.

== Selected publications ==
1. Cha, Meeyoung; Haddadi, Hamed; Benevenuto, Fabr´ıcio; Gummadi, Krishna P. (2010). "Measuring User Influence in Twitter: The Million Follower Fallacy". Proceedings of the Fourth International AAAI Conference on Weblogs and Social Media. Association for the Advancement of Artificial Intelligence. pp. 10–17. OCLC 780600252. Archived from the original on 4 February 2020.
2. Cha, Meeoung; Kwak, Haewoon; Rodriguez, Rodriguez; Ahn, Yong-Yeol; Moon, Sue (24 October 2007). "I Tube, You Tube, Everybody Tubes: Analyzing the World's Largest User Generated Content Video System" (PDF). Proceedings of the 7th ACM SIGCOMM conference on Internet measurement. 7th ACM SIGCOMM conference on Internet measurement.
3. Viswanath, Bimal; Mislove, Alan; Cha, Meeyoung; Gummadi, Krishna P. "On the Evolution of User Interaction in Facebook" (PDF). Proceedings of the 2nd ACM workshop on Online social networks. 2nd ACM workshop on Online social networks. ACM. pp. 37–42. Archived from the original (PDF) on 18 September 2017.
4. Benevenuto, Fabrício; Rodrigues, Tiago; Cha, Meeyoung; Almeida, Virgílio (4 November 2009). "Characterizing User Behavior in Online Social Networks" (PDF). Proceedings of the 9th ACM SIGCOMM conference on Internet measurement. 9th ACM SIGCOMM conference on Internet measurement. ACM. pp. 49–62.

== See also ==
- Hamed Haddadi
- Pablo Rodriguez
- Xing Xie
