= Marie-Francine Moens =

Belgian computer scientist

Marie-Francine (Sien) Moens (born 1957) is a Belgian computer scientist known for her research in natural language processing, argument mining, sentiment analysis, and information retrieval. She is a professor of computer science at KU Leuven.

== Education and career ==
Moens earned a master's degree in computer science at KU Leuven in 1992, and completed her Ph.D. there in 1999. Her dissertation was Automatically Indexing and Abstracting the Content of Document Texts. She was a researcher in the Centre for Law and ICT at KU Leuven beginning in 1992, took an assistant professor position in the centre in 2002, and moved to the computer science department as an associate professor in 2007. She was promoted to full professor in 2011. Moens was program co-chair of WSDM 2025 with Cha Meeyoung and Marc Najork.

== Books ==
Moens is the author of books including:

- Automatic Indexing and Abstracting of Document Texts (Kluwer, 2002)
- Information Extraction: Algorithms and Prospects in a Retrieval Context (Springer, 2006)
