= Kangwon Science High School =

High school in Wonju, South Korea

Coordinates: 37.3758538°N 127.9723281°E

- 강원과학고등학교
- Suseong, Daegu; South Korea

Information
- Type: Public
- Motto: 선각선행 (Foresight)
- Established: 1993
- Faculty: 57
- Enrollment: 136 (2023)
- Campus: 2242 Chiak-ro, Wonju, Gangwon Province
- Website: kangwon-sh.gwe.hs.kr

- Kangwon Science High School
- Hangul: 강원과학고등학교
- Hanja: 江原科學高等學校
- RR: Gangwon gwahak godeunghakgyo
- MR: Kangwŏn kwahak kodŭnghakkyo

Kangwon Science High School (Korean: 강원과학고등학교) is a science high school located in Gangwon Province, South Korea. The school opened in 1993. As of 2023, it has 136 students. The school tree is the ginko and the flower is the rose.

== History ==
- September 19, 1992 – Established
- September 22, 1992 – Approved as a special purpose high school (2 classes per grade, 30 students per class)
- November 30, 1992 – Completion of the school building (1 school building, 1 dormitory)
- March 1, 1993 – Inauguration of the first principal, Jeong Hwan-mok
- March 2, 1993 – Admission of first students (60 students)
- March 10, 1993 – Opening ceremony
- March 1, 1994 – Designated as a "Science Gifted Education Research School" by the Ministry of Education
- October 14, 1994 – Completion of dormitory
- October 27, 1997 – Astronomical observatory opened
- October 19, 1998 – Opening of Creation Hall
- December 14, 2005 – Opening of Sanglim Hall

== Alumni ==
- Cha Meeyoung, data scientist
- Kim Juu (김주우), SBS announcer
