= Pablo Rodriguez (computer scientist) =

Spanish computer scientist

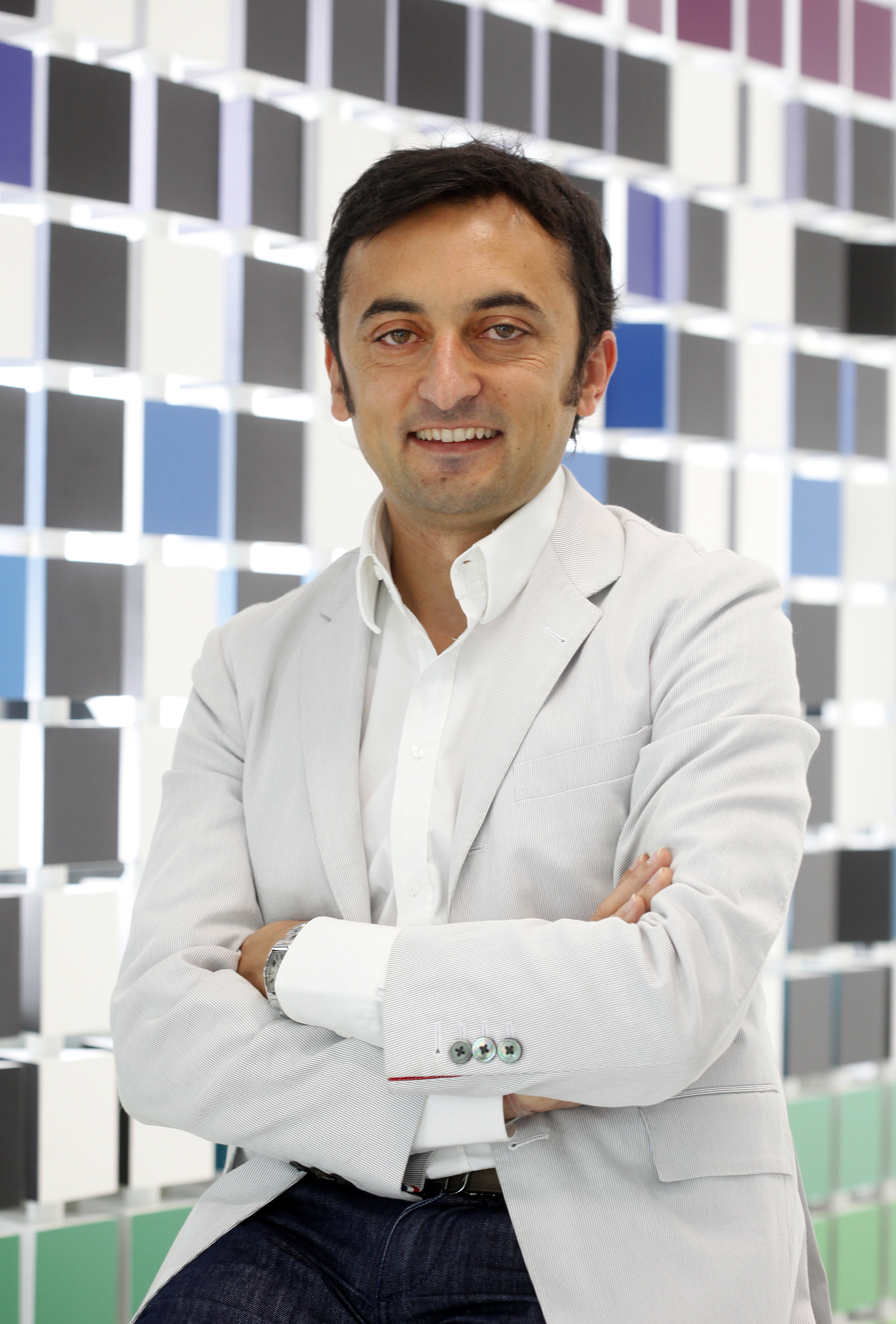
- Rodriguez in 2011
- Born: Oviedo, Asturias, Spain
- Education: École Polytechnique Fédérale de Lausanne
- Awards: ACM Fellow (2015)
- Scientific career
- Fields: Computer networking; distributed systems; content distribution; peer-to-peer; mobile communications
- Workplaces: École Polytechnique Fédérale de Lausanne; Columbia University; Telefónica
- Thesis: Scalable Content Distribution in the Internet (2000)
- Doctoral advisor: Ernst Biersack
- Website: www.rodriguezrodriguez.com

Pablo Rodriguez Rodriguez (Spanish pronunciation: [ˈpaβlo roˈðɾiɣeθ]) is a Spanish computer scientist and researcher, who is best known for his research in the mid-2000s on peer-to-peer file sharing and user-generated content. After working for technology and communications companies AT&T and Microsoft Research, Rodriguez returned to Spain in 2006 to become the research director for telecommunications provider Telefónica. In 2010 he took a position as an adjunct professor at Columbia University in New York City.

Rodriguez has been a frequent guest speaker at technology conferences in Europe, such as the International World Wide Web Conference, TEDx Barcelona, and the Wired Conference in London. He has collaborated with chef Ferran Adrià of the restaurant elBulli to develop Bullipedia, and in 2014 with football team FC Barcelona to analyze their strategies.

== Early life and education ==
Rodriguez was born in Oviedo, in the Asturias region of Spain. After studying for his Bachelor and Master of Science in Telecommunications Engineering at the Universidad Pública de Navarra (1990–1995), Rodriguez continued his Master's in computational physics at King's College London, studying electro-optical sensors and collaborating on the research paper Advances in high-resolution distributed sensing using a time-resolved photon counting technique.

Travelling to Switzerland and France, Rodriguez studied communication systems at a postgraduate level, and gained a PhD in Computer Science in 2000 from the École Polytechnique Fédérale de Lausanne. During his doctorate studies, Rodriguez worked as an intern at AT&T Labs in New Jersey, and researched scalability at the Institut Eurécom. At AT&T, Rodriguez filed his first patents, TCP transparent proxies. His dissertation in 2002, Scalable content distribution in the Internet, focused on scaling existing Internet architecture to perform content distribution to millions of users. As part of his doctorate, he designed parallel download algorithms to improve download times and resilience in peer-to-peer file swarming systems.

== Career ==
In the early 2000s, Rodriguez worked as a software architect for Silicon Valley companies such as search engine Inktomi, and network equipment company Tahoe Networks. In 2002, Rodriguez returned to AT&T to work at Bell Labs, where he researched many of the early concepts of peer-to-peer networks and mobile computing. Following this, Rodriguez returned to England to begin working at Microsoft Research Cambridge in their systems and networking research group. By 2004, Rodriguez had already having ten patents. In 2005, Rodriguez co-designed Avalanche, a peer-to-peer client for legal files proposed to improve download efficiency and copy protection, which was released in 2007 as Microsoft Secure Content Distribution. In addition to Avalanche, Rodriguez researched content distribution, wireless systems, and complex networks, while conducting studies assessing Windows Update, FolderShare and Xbox Live. Rodriguez further researched low-power datacasting with Julian Chesterfield of the University of Cambridge.

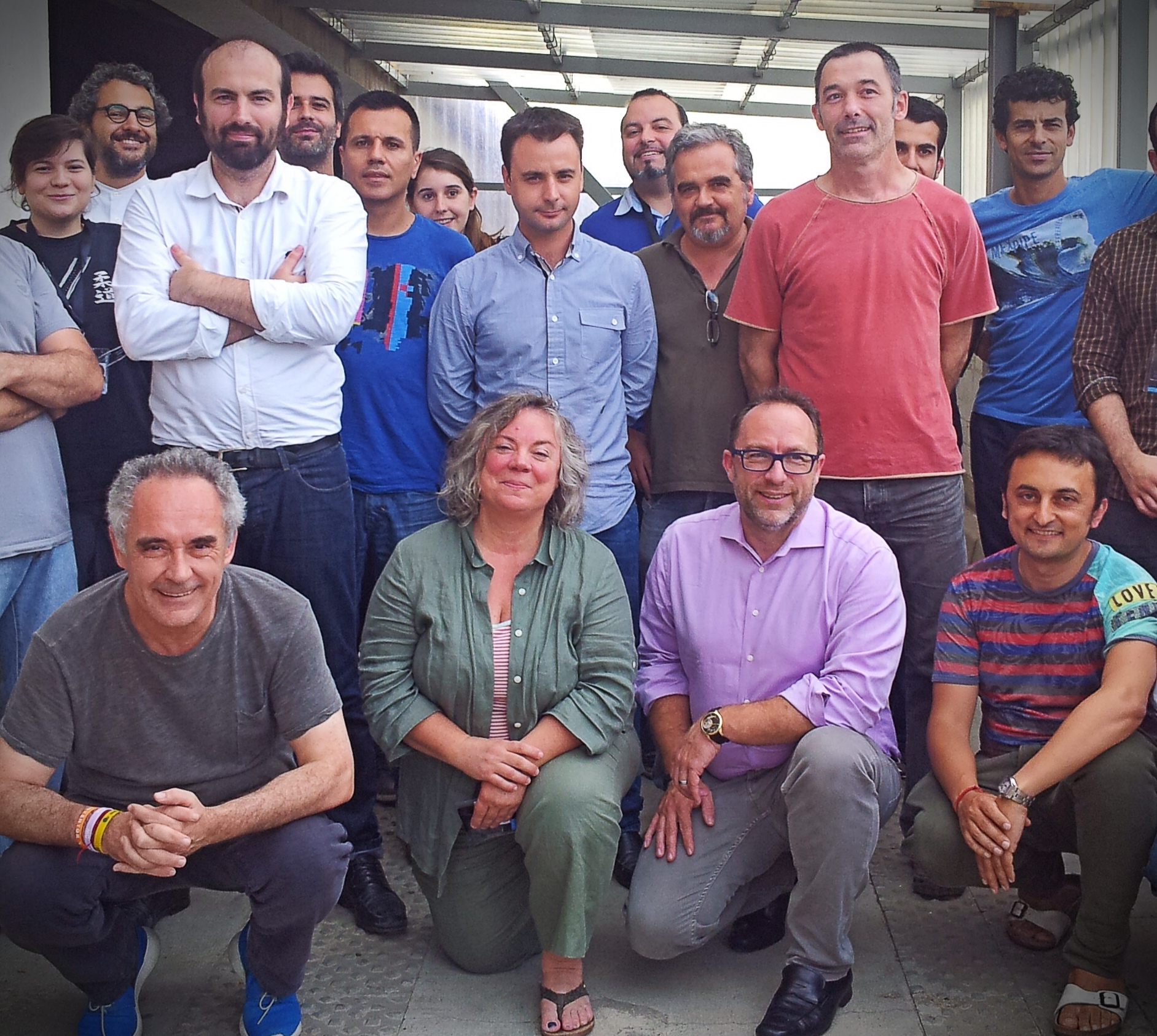
Wikipedia co-founder Jimmy Wales (center) with the Bullipedia team, including chef Ferran Adrià (bottom left) and Rodriguez (bottom right).

In November 2006, Rodriguez left the Avalanche project at Microsoft to work at Telefónica Catalunya in Barcelona, a center separate from Telefónica's main Madrid offices that was created in March 2006. There, he worked as the head of Telefónica's Barcelona research and development team, leading research on highly scalable distributed systems, next generation social networks and advanced wireless systems. In 2008, the team began working on BeWifi, a technology that employs ideas from peer-to-peer networks to gather additional bandwidth for Wi-Fi connections, using additional routers in the user's area. Initially employed as the Internet scientific director, in 2013 he became the center's director of research and innovation, focusing on big data concepts, until Telefónica Digital was merged into the company's Global Corporate Centre.

Rodriguez has been collaborating with chef Ferran Adrià of the former Michelin 3-star restaurant elBulli to develop Bullipedia: a Wiki format culinary repository of information about Spanish cuisine, which was first announced in early 2012. In 2014, Rodriguez collaborated with football team FC Barcelona to develop new strategies for football, by analyzing the team using network theory techniques.

Rodriguez is a member of several advisory boards for companies and associations, including the scientific journal IEEE/ACM Transactions on Networking, the IMDEA Networks Institute since 2010, and the art and science exhibition centre LABoral Centro de Arte y Creación Industrial in Gijón since 2013, and serves as a trustee board member of the Catalan Institution for Research and Advanced Studies since 2014.

=== University and educating ===
In the mid-2000s, Rodriguez collaborated on research papers dealing mainly with peer-to-peer content distribution. Two of these were highly influential in computer science: Network coding for large scale content distribution (2005) and Should internet service providers fear peer-assisted content distribution? (2005), which became highly cited papers for researchers. Network coding for large scale content distribution, as well as a paper analyzing YouTube networks, I tube, you tube, everybody tubes: analyzing the world's largest user generated content video system (2007), have been cited by thousands of papers and studies.

In 2010 he joined the computer science department of Columbia University as an adjunct professor, where he taught about social networks and next generation system architectures. He held this position until 2012.

In 2009, Rodriguez was one of four keynote speakers at the International World Wide Web Conference, held in Madrid. Rodriguez has spoken at TEDx Barcelona in 2011 and 2014, discussing distributed programming and later net neutrality. At the 2013 Internet Measurement Conference, Rodriguez delivered the keynote speech, while receiving an award for a paper he collaborated on, entitled Follow the Money: Understanding Economics of Online Aggregation and Advertising. In 2013 he was a part of a panel on Re-architecting the Internet for the Institute of Electrical and Electronics Engineers' conference Infocom 2013, and in 2014 attended the Wired Conference as a guest speaker, discussing his research on FC Barcelona's strategies.

== Awards and honors ==
In 2015 he was named a fellow of the Association for Computing Machinery "for contributions to content distribution architectures in peer-to-peer networks."

== See also ==
- Hamed Haddadi
- Cha Meeyoung
