= Avalanche (P2P) =

Avalanche is the name of a proposed peer-to-peer (P2P) network created by Pablo Rodriguez and Christos Gkantsidis at Microsoft, which claims to offer improved scalability and bandwidth efficiency compared to existing P2P systems.

The proposed system works in a similar way to BitTorrent, but aims to improve some of its shortfalls. Like BitTorrent, Avalanche splits the file to be distributed into small blocks. However, rather than peers simply transmitting the blocks, they transmit random linear combinations of the blocks along with the random coefficients of this linear combination - a technique known as 'network coding'. This technique removes the need for each peer to have complex knowledge of block distribution across the network (an aspect of BitTorrent-like protocols which the paper claims does not scale very well).

Bram Cohen, the creator of BitTorrent, criticized the proposed Avalanche system in a post to his blog. He said there were inaccuracies in the paper's analysis of the BitTorrent protocol (some of it being based on a 4-years-out-of-date version of the protocol which used an algorithm that "sucks") and described the paper as "garbage".
