= Copyleaks =

Plagiarism detection platform

- Website type: SaaS for AI Content and Plagiarism Detection
- Founded: 2015
- Headquarters: New York, NY
- Area served: Worldwide
- Founders: Alon Yamin and Yehonatan Bitton
- CEO: Alon Yamin
- Industry: Education and Enterprise
- Website: copyleaks.com
- Registration: Yes

Copyleaks is a plagiarism detection platform that uses artificial intelligence (AI) to identify similar and identical content across various formats.

Copyleaks was founded in 2015 by Alon Yamin and Yehonatan Bitton, software developers working with text analysis, AI, machine learning, and other technologies.

Copyleaks' product suite is used by businesses, educational institutions, and individuals to identify potential plagiarism and AI-generated content in order to provide transparency around responsible AI adoption.

In 2022, Copyleaks raised $7.75 million to expand its anti-plagiarism capabilities.

== Services ==
Copyleaks offers a suite of tools for academic institutions, businesses, and individuals designed to detect plagiarism and content generated by artificial intelligence. The service analyzes text by comparing it against a database and by using an AI model to comprehend semantic meaning and writing style.

The AI detection tool is intended to identify text produced by large language models, including cases where text may be paraphrased to mask AI generation. It is also available as a Chrome extension to verify online content.

The company also provides a specific tool, Codeleaks, for detecting AI-generated and plagiarized source code, which also identifies the original software license.

== Reception ==
The accuracy and reliability of AI detection tools, including Copyleaks, have been subjects of academic study. In June 2023, a study published in the International Journal for Educational Integrity found that AI detection tools were often inaccurate and unreliable. A separate analysis in the same journal of five AI content detection tools found that Copyleaks had the highest sensitivity (the proportion of AI-generated content correctly identified) at 93% for content generated by GPT-4, but struggled with texts that had been modified by humans.

A November 2023 analysis by a research team from the University of Adelaide found Copyleaks to be one of the more reliable of the tools tested, though none of them were completely reliable. In one test, the researchers wrote a film critique in the style of a 14-year-old student; Copyleaks determined an 85.2% probability of AI-generated content. After the text was altered by a human, the tool returned a 73.1% probability. The researchers concluded that "the real takeaway is that we should assume students will be able to break any AI-detection tools, regardless of their sophistication.

== See also ==
- GPTZero
- Undetectable.ai
- Artificial intelligence content detection
