= Max Planck Institute for Security and Privacy =

German computer science institute

Coordinates: 51.4442°N 7.2566°E

The Max Planck Institute for Security and Privacy (MPI-SP) is a computer science research institute founded in May 2019 and located in Bochum, Germany. The institute mission is to study and develop the technical foundations and interdisciplinary aspects of cyber security and privacy.

The institute is one of six researching computer science as a part of the Max-Planck-Gesellschaft. The founding directors are Gilles Barthe and Christof Paar with the intention to recruit further tenure-track faculty each year. In 2024, Cha Meeyoung joined as the scientific director making her the first South Korean to be a Max Planck director.
