= Computer Networks (journal) =

- Language: English

Publication details
- Publisher: Elsevier
- Frequency: 18/year
- Impact factor: 4.474 (2020)

Standard abbreviations
- ISO 4: Comput. Netw.

Indexing
- ISSN: 1389-1286

Links
- Journal homepage

Computer Networks is a scientific journal of computer and telecommunications networking published by Elsevier.

== See also ==
- List of scientific journals
