= GPTZero =

Artificial intelligence detection software

- Developers: Edward Tian; Alex Cui; Yazan Mimi
- Release: 3 January 2023; 3 years ago
- Written in: Python
- Platform: Cloud computing
- Website: gptzero.me

GPTZero is an artificial intelligence detection software developed to identify artificially generated text, such as those produced by large language models.

While GPTZero was praised for its efforts to prevent academic dishonesty, many news outlets criticized the tool's false positive rate, which can be especially harmful in academic settings.

== History ==
GPTZero was developed by Edward Tian, a Princeton University undergraduate student, and launched online in January 2023 in response to concerns about AI-generated usage in academic plagiarism. GPTZero said in May 2023 it raised over 3.5 million dollars in seed funding.

GPTZero experienced 30,000 uses in the first week of its release, which led to a crash. It was supported by the web app company Streamlit, who allocated more server resources in response. In July 2024, it had 4 million users, compared to 1 million one year earlier.

In summer 2024, GPTZero raised $10 million in Series A round funding. In September that year, GPTZero announced an authorship tracking software that enables "to compile and share data about their writing process such as their copy/paste history, the number of editors they had, and how long editing took", in an effort "to move away from an all-or-nothing paradigm around AI writing towards a more nuanced one."

Superhuman, a company that develops AI-powered email software for productivity and workflow automation, announced that it had acquired GPTZero in June 2026. Superhuman planned to integrate GPTZero into its Superhuman Go AI assistant, while GPTZero said the acquisition would help place its tools in products where users already read and write.

== Mechanism ==
When it first launched, GPTZero used qualities it termed perplexity and burstiness to attempt to determine if a passage was written by an AI. According to the company, perplexity is how random the text in the sentence is, and whether the way the sentence is constructed is unusual or "surprising" for the application. Texts with language that is more chaotic or unfamiliar to language models—i.e., that are likely to "perplex" the model—are deemed more likely to be written by humans. In contrast, burstiness compares sentences with each other, determining their similarity. Human text is more discontinuous, meaning humans tend to write with more sentence variation than AI.

In autumn 2023, GPTZero stopped using perplexity and burstiness and switched to an end-to-end deep learning based classifier trained on a dataset of millions of documents from domains such as creative writing, scientific writing, and news articles. The GPTZero classifier predicts if a text is entirely human-written, entirely AI-generated, or a mix of both, such as a human-written text that was polished by AI. It provides classification results at the document and sentence level and assigns a confidence score to its predictions.

As of September 2025, free tier users can scan 10,000 words a month, with a max of 10,000 characters per scan.

== Use cases ==
The academic community has attempted using GPTZero to tackle concerns about AI-generated content for plagiarism. Educational institutions, including Princeton University, have discussed the use of GPTZero to combat AI-generated content in academic settings, with mixed opinions. In October 2023, GPTZero had partnered with the American Federation of Teachers.

By 2024, Tian reported that GPTZero also "received a lot of adoption with hiring managers, with recruiting [and] cover letter analysis."

== Efficacy ==
In a March 2023 paper named "Can AI-Generated Text be Reliably Detected?", computer scientists Vinu Sankar Sadasivan, Aounon Kumar, Sriram Balasubramanian, Wenxiao Wang, and Soheil Feizi from the University of Maryland demonstrate empirically and theoretically that several AI-text detectors are not reliable in practical scenarios.

Tech website Futurism tested the tool, and said that while the "results are impressive", based on its error rate, teachers relying on the tool would end up "falsely accusing nearly 20 percent of [innocent students] of academic misconduct".

The Washington Post noted in August 2023 that GPTZero suffers from false positives, emphasizing that "even a small 'false positive' error rate means that some students could be wrongly accused [of academic misconduct]".

In September 2025, Business Insider compared the tool to seven other AI detection tools, and called GPTZero the "best free AI detector."

== See also ==
- Artificial intelligence content detection
- Ethics of artificial intelligence
- Natural language processing
- ChatGPT
- Pangram (AI detector)
- Text generation
- Turing test
