= Perplexity =

Concept in information theory

In information theory, perplexity is a measurement of how well a probability distribution or probability model predicts a sample. It may be used to compare probability models. A low perplexity indicates the probability distribution is good at predicting the sample.

== Perplexity of a Probability Distribution ==
The perplexity PP of a discrete probability distribution p is a concept widely used in information theory, machine learning, and statistical modeling. It is defined as

$$\mathit{PP}(p) := 2^{H(p)}=2^{-\sum_x p(x)\log_2 p(x)}=\prod_x p(x)^{-p(x)}$$

where H(p) is the entropy (in bits) of the distribution, and x ranges over the events. The base of the logarithm need not be 2: The perplexity is independent of the base, provided that the entropy and the exponentiation use the same base. In some contexts, this measure is also referred to as the (order-1 true) diversity.

Perplexity of a random variable X may be defined as the perplexity of the distribution over its possible values x. It can be thought of as a measure of uncertainty or "surprise" related to the outcomes.

In the special case where p models a fair k-sided die (a uniform distribution over k discrete events), its perplexity is k. A random variable with perplexity k has the same uncertainty as a fair k-sided die. One is said to be "k-ways perplexed" about the value of the random variable. Unless it is a fair k-sided die, more than k values may be possible, but the overall uncertainty is not greater because some values may have a probability greater than 1/k.

Perplexity is sometimes used as a measure of the difficulty of a prediction problem. However, it's not always an accurate representation. For example, if you have two choices, one with probability 0.9, your chances of a correct guess using the optimal strategy are 90 percent. Yet, the perplexity is $2^{-0.9\log_2(0.9)-0.1\log_2(0.1)}=1.38$. The inverse of the perplexity, 1/1.38 = 0.72, does not correspond to the 0.9 probability.

The perplexity is the exponentiation of the entropy, a more straightforward quantity. Entropy measures the expected or "average" number of bits required to encode the outcome of the random variable using an optimal variable-length code. It can also be regarded as the expected information gain from learning the outcome of the random variable, providing insight into the uncertainty and complexity of the underlying probability distribution.

== Perplexity of a probability model ==
A model of an unknown probability distribution p, may be proposed based on a training sample that was drawn from p. Given a proposed probability model q, one may evaluate q by asking how well it predicts a separate test sample x_{1}, x_{2}, ..., x_{N} also drawn from p. The perplexity of the model q is defined as

$$b^{- \frac{1}{N} \sum_{i=1}^N \log_b q(x_i)} = \left(\prod_i q(x_i) \right)^{-1/N}$$

where $b$ is customarily 2. Better models q of the unknown distribution p will tend to assign higher probabilities q(x_{i}) to the test events. Thus, they have lower perplexity: they are less surprised by the test sample.

The exponent above may be regarded as the average number of bits needed to represent a test event x_{i} if one uses an optimal code based on q. Low-perplexity models do a better job of compressing the test sample, requiring few bits per test element on average because q(x_{i}) tends to be high.

The exponent $- \frac{1}{N} \sum_{i=1}^N \log_b q(x_i)$ may also be interpreted as a cross-entropy:

$$H(\tilde{p},q) = -\sum_x \tilde{p}(x) \log_b q(x)$$

where $\tilde{p}$ denotes the empirical distribution of the test sample (i.e., $\tilde{p}(x) = n/N$ if x appeared n times in the test sample of size N).

By the definition of KL divergence, it is also equal to
$$H(\tilde p) + D_{KL}(\tilde p \| q)$$
which is $\geq H(\tilde p)$. Consequently, the perplexity is minimized when $q = \tilde p$.

== Perplexity per word ==
In natural language processing, a corpus is a set of sentences or texts, and a language model is a probability distribution over entire sentences or texts. Consequently, in NLP, the more commonly used measure is perplexity per word, defined as:
$$\left(\prod_{i=1}^n q(s_i) \right)^{-1/N}$$
where $s_1, ..., s_n$ are the $n$ sentences in the corpus, but $N$ is the number of words in the corpus. This normalizes the perplexity by the length of the text, allowing for more meaningful comparisons between different texts or models.

Suppose the average sentence x_{i} in the corpus has a probability of $2^{-190}$ according to the language model. This would give a model perplexity of 2^{190} per sentence. However, it is more common to normalize for sentence length. Thus, if the test sample's sentences comprised a total of 1,000 words, and could be coded using 7.95 bits per word, one could report a model perplexity of 2^{7.95} = 247 per word. In other words, the model is as confused on test data as if it had to choose uniformly and independently among 247 possibilities for each word.

=== Recent Advances in Language Modeling ===
Since 2007, significant advancements in language modeling have emerged, particularly with the advent of deep learning techniques. Perplexity per word, a measure that quantifies the predictive power of a language model, has remained central to evaluating models like transformers, BERT, GPT-2, and others. This measure is employed to compare different models on the same dataset and guide the optimization of hyperparameters, although it has been found sensitive to factors such as linguistic features and sentence length. Despite its pivotal role in language model development, perplexity has shown limitations, particularly as an inadequate predictor of speech recognition performance, where it may not correlate well with word-error rates, raising questions about its accuracy.

=== Brown corpus ===
The lowest perplexity that has been published on the Brown Corpus (1 million words of American English of varying topics and genres) as of 1992 is indeed about 247 per word, corresponding to a cross-entropy of log_{2}247 = 7.95 bits per word or 1.75 bits per letter using a trigram model. It is often possible to achieve lower perplexity on more specialized corpora, as they are more predictable.

Simply guessing that the next word in the Brown corpus is the word "the" will have an accuracy of 7 percent, not 1/247 = 0.4 percent, as a naive use of perplexity as a measure of predictiveness might lead one to believe. This guess is based on the unigram statistics of the Brown corpus, not on the trigram statistics, which yielded the word perplexity 247. Using trigram statistics would further improve the chances of a correct guess.

== See also ==
- Statistical model validation
