= Google Research =

Research division of Google

- Founded: 2000
- Founder: Google
- Type: Division
- Location: Mountain View, California, United States
- Services: Computer science, Artificial intelligence
- Parent organization: Alphabet Inc.
- Website: research.google

Google Research (also known as Research at Google) is the research division of Google, a subsidiary of Alphabet. According to its official website, Google Research publishes findings, releases open-source software, and applies research results within Google products and services as well as within the wider scientific community.

== Notable contributions ==
- The 2017 landmark paper Attention Is All You Need, which introduced the Transformer architecture, which has subsequently been used to build modern large language models.
- Advances in neural machine translation powering Google Translate.
- Time series forecasting.
- Development of scalable learning systems and infrastructure for large-model training.
- Flood forecasting.
- Research into computational discovery via Google Accelerated Science including demonstrating the first below-threshold quantum calculations.

== See also ==
- Google AI
- Google Brain
- Google DeepMind
